This is a partial list of unnumbered minor planets for principal provisional designations assigned between 16 October and 31 December 1999. , a total of 473 bodies remain unnumbered for this period. Objects for this year are listed on the following pages: A–R · S–T and U–Y. Also see previous and next year.

U 

|- id="1999 UQ" bgcolor=#FFC2E0
| 2 || 1999 UQ || AMO || 21.8 || data-sort-value="0.16" | 160 m || multiple || 1999–2015 || 02 Nov 2015 || 103 || align=left | Disc.: LINEAR || 
|- id="1999 UR" bgcolor=#FFC2E0
| 1 || 1999 UR || APO || 21.5 || data-sort-value="0.18" | 180 m || multiple || 1999–2013 || 13 Feb 2013 || 76 || align=left | Disc.: LINEARPotentially hazardous object || 
|- id="1999 UX4" bgcolor=#d6d6d6
| 0 ||  || MBA-O || 16.75 || 2.5 km || multiple || 1999–2021 || 27 Nov 2021 || 73 || align=left | Disc.: SpacewatchAlt.: 2010 UB130 || 
|- id="1999 UK5" bgcolor=#FA8072
| 0 ||  || MCA || 17.1 || 1.6 km || multiple || 1999–2021 || 14 Jan 2021 || 304 || align=left | Disc.: LINEARAlt.: 2000 AP153 || 
|- id="1999 UZ5" bgcolor=#FFC2E0
| – ||  || APO || 21.8 || data-sort-value="0.16" | 160 m || single || 4 days || 04 Nov 1999 || 32 || align=left | Disc.: CSS || 
|- id="1999 UP9" bgcolor=#E9E9E9
| 1 ||  || MBA-M || 16.9 || 1.2 km || multiple || 1999–2021 || 18 Jan 2021 || 90 || align=left | Disc.: LINEARAdded on 17 January 2021 || 
|- id="1999 UD12" bgcolor=#E9E9E9
| 0 ||  || MBA-M || 17.77 || data-sort-value="0.75" | 850 m || multiple || 1999-2021 || 04 Jan 2021 || 42 || align=left | Disc.: Spacewatch || 
|- id="1999 UD18" bgcolor=#E9E9E9
| 1 ||  || MBA-M || 18.5 || data-sort-value="0.59" | 590 m || multiple || 1999–2020 || 14 Nov 2020 || 34 || align=left | Disc.: Spacewatch || 
|- id="1999 UE18" bgcolor=#d6d6d6
| 2 ||  || MBA-O || 16.7 || 2.5 km || multiple || 1999–2020 || 17 Dec 2020 || 117 || align=left | Disc.: SpacewatchAlt.: 2009 SH281 || 
|- id="1999 UM18" bgcolor=#E9E9E9
| 1 ||  || MBA-M || 18.0 || 1.1 km || multiple || 1999–2021 || 06 Jan 2021 || 186 || align=left | Disc.: Spacewatch || 
|- id="1999 UQ19" bgcolor=#d6d6d6
| 0 ||  || MBA-O || 16.03 || 3.5 km || multiple || 1999–2021 || 30 Nov 2021 || 180 || align=left | Disc.: Spacewatch || 
|- id="1999 UH20" bgcolor=#fefefe
| 1 ||  || MBA-I || 18.8 || data-sort-value="0.52" | 520 m || multiple || 1999–2020 || 19 Oct 2020 || 97 || align=left | Disc.: Spacewatch || 
|- id="1999 UM21" bgcolor=#d6d6d6
| 0 ||  || MBA-O || 17.25 || 2.0 km || multiple || 1999–2021 || 11 May 2021 || 79 || align=left | Disc.: SpacewatchAlt.: 2004 TW364 || 
|- id="1999 UW21" bgcolor=#d6d6d6
| 0 ||  || MBA-O || 17.66 || 1.6 km || multiple || 1999–2021 || 03 Apr 2021 || 29 || align=left | Disc.: Spacewatch || 
|- id="1999 UL22" bgcolor=#E9E9E9
| 0 ||  || MBA-M || 17.1 || 2.1 km || multiple || 1999–2021 || 14 Jul 2021 || 44 || align=left | Disc.: SpacewatchAdded on 21 August 2021Alt.: 2013 RH152, 2015 FR367 || 
|- id="1999 UQ22" bgcolor=#d6d6d6
| 0 ||  || MBA-O || 16.95 || 2.3 km || multiple || 1999–2021 || 08 Sep 2021 || 61 || align=left | Disc.: SpacewatchAdded on 13 September 2020 || 
|- id="1999 UU22" bgcolor=#d6d6d6
| 0 ||  || MBA-O || 16.84 || 2.4 km || multiple || 1994–2021 || 15 Apr 2021 || 160 || align=left | Disc.: SpacewatchAlt.: 2004 TY357, 2013 RR126, 2013 SC60 || 
|- id="1999 UW22" bgcolor=#E9E9E9
| 0 ||  || MBA-M || 17.5 || 1.8 km || multiple || 1999–2020 || 19 Apr 2020 || 49 || align=left | Disc.: Spacewatch || 
|- id="1999 UX30" bgcolor=#E9E9E9
| 0 ||  || MBA-M || 18.54 || data-sort-value="0.82" | 820 m || multiple || 1999–2022 || 25 Jan 2022 || 39 || align=left | Disc.: Spacewatch || 
|- id="1999 UF31" bgcolor=#d6d6d6
| 0 ||  || MBA-O || 16.4 || 2.9 km || multiple || 1999–2020 || 05 Dec 2020 || 126 || align=left | Disc.: SpacewatchAlt.: 2004 RM267, 2008 KK22, 2015 VU81 || 
|- id="1999 UL31" bgcolor=#E9E9E9
| 1 ||  || MBA-M || 18.52 || data-sort-value="0.59" | 590 m || multiple || 1999–2021 || 17 Feb 2021 || 31 || align=left | Disc.: SpacewatchAdded on 11 May 2021 || 
|- id="1999 UU31" bgcolor=#fefefe
| 0 ||  || MBA-I || 18.3 || data-sort-value="0.65" | 650 m || multiple || 1999–2020 || 21 Apr 2020 || 70 || align=left | Disc.: Spacewatch || 
|- id="1999 UU32" bgcolor=#fefefe
| 0 ||  || MBA-I || 18.45 || data-sort-value="0.61" | 610 m || multiple || 1999–2022 || 25 Jan 2022 || 77 || align=left | Disc.: SpacewatchAlt.: 2006 SM227 || 
|- id="1999 UZ32" bgcolor=#d6d6d6
| 0 ||  || MBA-O || 17.6 || 1.7 km || multiple || 1999–2020 || 17 Dec 2020 || 71 || align=left | Disc.: SpacewatchAlt.: 2004 RS299 || 
|- id="1999 UZ33" bgcolor=#fefefe
| 0 ||  || MBA-I || 18.5 || data-sort-value="0.59" | 590 m || multiple || 1999–2020 || 27 Jan 2020 || 39 || align=left | Disc.: SpacewatchAlt.: 2007 YA17 || 
|- id="1999 UM34" bgcolor=#fefefe
| 0 ||  || MBA-I || 19.0 || data-sort-value="0.47" | 470 m || multiple || 1999–2021 || 13 Feb 2021 || 55 || align=left | Disc.: SpacewatchAlt.: 2006 WV137 || 
|- id="1999 UD35" bgcolor=#E9E9E9
| 0 ||  || MBA-M || 17.21 || 2.0 km || multiple || 1999–2021 || 19 May 2021 || 93 || align=left | Disc.: SpacewatchAdded on 11 May 2021Alt.: 2021 GG46 || 
|- id="1999 UL35" bgcolor=#E9E9E9
| 1 ||  || MBA-M || 18.3 || data-sort-value="0.65" | 650 m || multiple || 1999–2019 || 25 Sep 2019 || 33 || align=left | Disc.: Spacewatch || 
|- id="1999 UM35" bgcolor=#E9E9E9
| 0 ||  || MBA-M || 17.9 || data-sort-value="0.78" | 780 m || multiple || 1999–2020 || 19 Nov 2020 || 41 || align=left | Disc.: Spacewatch || 
|- id="1999 UT36" bgcolor=#fefefe
| 0 ||  || HUN || 18.3 || data-sort-value="0.65" | 650 m || multiple || 1999–2021 || 06 Jan 2021 || 90 || align=left | Disc.: Spacewatch || 
|- id="1999 UC38" bgcolor=#E9E9E9
| 0 ||  || MBA-M || 18.0 || 1.1 km || multiple || 1999–2020 || 21 Sep 2020 || 111 || align=left | Disc.: Spacewatch || 
|- id="1999 UN39" bgcolor=#E9E9E9
| 2 ||  || MBA-M || 18.5 || data-sort-value="0.84" | 840 m || multiple || 1999–2020 || 06 Dec 2020 || 81 || align=left | Disc.: SpacewatchAdded on 17 January 2021Alt.: 2016 UO254 || 
|- id="1999 UU39" bgcolor=#fefefe
| 1 ||  || MBA-I || 19.21 || data-sort-value="0.39" | 430 m || multiple || 1999-2022 || 23 Oct 2022 || 55 || align=left | Disc.: Spacewatch Alt.: 2022 SZ26|| 
|- id="1999 UV39" bgcolor=#fefefe
| 3 ||  || MBA-I || 19.3 || data-sort-value="0.41" | 410 m || multiple || 1999–2016 || 05 Nov 2016 || 27 || align=left | Disc.: Spacewatch || 
|- id="1999 UP40" bgcolor=#d6d6d6
| 0 ||  || MBA-O || 16.8 || 2.4 km || multiple || 1994–2021 || 09 Jan 2021 || 83 || align=left | Disc.: SpacewatchAlt.: 1999 UO58 || 
|- id="1999 UB41" bgcolor=#fefefe
| 2 ||  || MBA-I || 18.6 || data-sort-value="0.57" | 570 m || multiple || 1999–2021 || 24 Sep 2021 || 40 || align=left | Disc.: Spacewatch || 
|- id="1999 UO53" bgcolor=#fefefe
| 0 ||  || MBA-I || 18.5 || data-sort-value="0.59" | 590 m || multiple || 1999–2018 || 12 Feb 2018 || 52 || align=left | Disc.: SpacewatchAlt.: 2006 VO25 || 
|- id="1999 US54" bgcolor=#E9E9E9
| 0 ||  || MBA-M || 17.5 || data-sort-value="0.94" | 940 m || multiple || 1999–2020 || 05 Nov 2020 || 141 || align=left | Disc.: SpacewatchAlt.: 2011 KB48, 2011 LD28 || 
|- id="1999 UC55" bgcolor=#fefefe
| 0 ||  = (619183) || MBA-I || 18.5 || data-sort-value="0.59" | 590 m || multiple || 1999–2018 || 06 Oct 2018 || 63 || align=left | Disc.: Spacewatch || 
|- id="1999 UK55" bgcolor=#E9E9E9
| 0 ||  || MBA-M || 18.1 || data-sort-value="0.71" | 710 m || multiple || 1999–2021 || 05 Jan 2021 || 35 || align=left | Disc.: SpacewatchAdded on 9 March 2021Alt.: 2013 BR70 || 
|- id="1999 UM56" bgcolor=#E9E9E9
| 0 ||  || MBA-M || 17.21 || 2.0 km || multiple || 1999–2021 || 30 Jun 2021 || 66 || align=left | Disc.: Spacewatch || 
|- id="1999 UH57" bgcolor=#fefefe
| 0 ||  || MBA-I || 18.06 || data-sort-value="0.73" | 730 m || multiple || 1999–2021 || 19 Nov 2021 || 118 || align=left | Disc.: SpacewatchAdded on 22 July 2020Alt.: 2014 WG484 || 
|- id="1999 UU57" bgcolor=#E9E9E9
| 0 ||  || MBA-M || 18.17 || data-sort-value="0.98" | 980 m || multiple || 1999–2021 || 08 Dec 2021 || 63 || align=left | Disc.: Spacewatch || 
|- id="1999 UA58" bgcolor=#fefefe
| 0 ||  || MBA-I || 19.04 || data-sort-value="0.46" | 460 m || multiple || 1999–2021 || 25 Nov 2021 || 78 || align=left | Disc.: SpacewatchAlt.: 2017 QX18 || 
|- id="1999 UC58" bgcolor=#fefefe
| 0 ||  || MBA-I || 17.9 || data-sort-value="0.78" | 780 m || multiple || 1999–2020 || 22 Mar 2020 || 44 || align=left | Disc.: Spacewatch || 
|- id="1999 UP58" bgcolor=#fefefe
| 3 ||  || MBA-I || 19.0 || data-sort-value="0.47" | 470 m || multiple || 1992–2017 || 13 Dec 2017 || 40 || align=left | Disc.: SpacewatchAlt.: 1992 WR7 || 
|- id="1999 UY58" bgcolor=#fefefe
| 0 ||  || MBA-I || 18.85 || data-sort-value="0.50" | 500 m || multiple || 1999–2021 || 08 Dec 2021 || 54 || align=left | Disc.: Spacewatch || 
|- id="1999 UB59" bgcolor=#E9E9E9
| 0 ||  || MBA-M || 17.7 || 1.2 km || multiple || 1999–2021 || 05 Jan 2021 || 143 || align=left | Disc.: SpacewatchAlt.: 2016 TN9 || 
|- id="1999 UF59" bgcolor=#fefefe
| 0 ||  || MBA-I || 18.6 || data-sort-value="0.57" | 570 m || multiple || 1999–2020 || 16 Oct 2020 || 48 || align=left | Disc.: SpacewatchAdded on 19 October 2020 || 
|- id="1999 UJ59" bgcolor=#fefefe
| 0 ||  || MBA-I || 18.47 || data-sort-value="0.60" | 600 m || multiple || 1999–2021 || 08 May 2021 || 43 || align=left | Disc.: SpacewatchAdded on 22 July 2020 || 
|- id="1999 US59" bgcolor=#d6d6d6
| 0 ||  || MBA-O || 17.34 || 1.9 km || multiple || 1999–2022 || 27 Jan 2022 || 120 || align=left | Disc.: SpacewatchAdded on 22 July 2020Alt.: 2014 OA80 || 
|- id="1999 UT59" bgcolor=#d6d6d6
| 0 ||  || MBA-O || 17.1 || 2.1 km || multiple || 1999–2020 || 16 Dec 2020 || 36 || align=left | Disc.: SpacewatchAdded on 17 January 2021 || 
|- id="1999 UN61" bgcolor=#E9E9E9
| 0 ||  || MBA-M || 17.0 || 2.2 km || multiple || 1999–2020 || 16 Mar 2020 || 108 || align=left | Disc.: SpacewatchAlt.: 2006 DL144 || 
|- id="1999 UY63" bgcolor=#fefefe
| 0 ||  || MBA-I || 18.31 || data-sort-value="0.65" | 650 m || multiple || 1995–2021 || 11 Jun 2021 || 187 || align=left | Disc.: Spacewatch || 
|- id="1999 UU64" bgcolor=#d6d6d6
| 0 ||  || MBA-O || 17.49 || 1.8 km || multiple || 1999–2021 || 11 Apr 2021 || 89 || align=left | Disc.: SDSSAlt.: 2004 TV95, 2009 UV142 || 
|- id="1999 UF65" bgcolor=#E9E9E9
| 0 ||  || MBA-M || 17.9 || data-sort-value="0.78" | 780 m || multiple || 1999–2019 || 26 Sep 2019 || 75 || align=left | Disc.: SDSSAlt.: 2003 SC367, 2007 RG224 || 
|- id="1999 UJ65" bgcolor=#d6d6d6
| 0 ||  || MBA-O || 15.83 || 3.8 km || multiple || 1999–2022 || 07 Jan 2022 || 195 || align=left | Disc.: Spacewatch || 
|- id="1999 UK65" bgcolor=#fefefe
| 0 ||  || MBA-I || 18.19 || data-sort-value="0.68" | 680 m || multiple || 1999–2021 || 27 Oct 2021 || 103 || align=left | Disc.: SpacewatchAlt.: 2010 TF226 || 
|- id="1999 UL65" bgcolor=#E9E9E9
| 0 ||  || MBA-M || 16.56 || 2.0 km || multiple || 1999–2021 || 05 Nov 2021 || 137 || align=left | Disc.: SDSS || 
|- id="1999 UM65" bgcolor=#d6d6d6
| 0 ||  || MBA-O || 16.06 || 3.4 km || multiple || 1999–2021 || 24 Sep 2021 || 193 || align=left | Disc.: SDSS || 
|- id="1999 UN65" bgcolor=#d6d6d6
| 0 ||  = (619184) || MBA-O || 16.7 || 2.5 km || multiple || 1999–2020 || 16 May 2020 || 74 || align=left | Disc.: SpacewatchAlt.: 2005 VF29 || 
|- id="1999 UO65" bgcolor=#fefefe
| 0 ||  || MBA-I || 17.7 || data-sort-value="0.86" | 860 m || multiple || 1999–2019 || 30 Nov 2019 || 92 || align=left | Disc.: SDSS || 
|- id="1999 UP65" bgcolor=#E9E9E9
| 0 ||  || MBA-M || 17.4 || data-sort-value="0.98" | 980 m || multiple || 1999–2021 || 09 Jan 2021 || 101 || align=left | Disc.: Spacewatch || 
|- id="1999 UQ65" bgcolor=#fefefe
| 0 ||  || MBA-I || 18.07 || data-sort-value="0.72" | 720 m || multiple || 1999–2021 || 30 Nov 2021 || 174 || align=left | Disc.: SDSS || 
|- id="1999 UR65" bgcolor=#d6d6d6
| 0 ||  || MBA-O || 16.19 || 3.2 km || multiple || 1999–2022 || 27 Jan 2022 || 203 || align=left | Disc.: SDSS || 
|- id="1999 UT65" bgcolor=#d6d6d6
| 0 ||  || MBA-O || 17.35 || 1.9 km || multiple || 1999–2021 || 08 May 2021 || 83 || align=left | Disc.: Spacewatch || 
|- id="1999 UV65" bgcolor=#fefefe
| 0 ||  || MBA-I || 18.32 || data-sort-value="0.64" | 640 m || multiple || 1999–2021 || 29 Nov 2021 || 118 || align=left | Disc.: SDSS || 
|- id="1999 UW65" bgcolor=#fefefe
| 0 ||  || MBA-I || 18.1 || data-sort-value="0.71" | 710 m || multiple || 1999–2021 || 17 Jan 2021 || 87 || align=left | Disc.: Spacewatch || 
|- id="1999 UX65" bgcolor=#fefefe
| 0 ||  || MBA-I || 17.7 || data-sort-value="0.86" | 860 m || multiple || 1999–2020 || 13 Jul 2020 || 74 || align=left | Disc.: Spacewatch || 
|- id="1999 UZ65" bgcolor=#d6d6d6
| 0 ||  || MBA-O || 16.3 || 3.1 km || multiple || 1999–2020 || 16 Nov 2020 || 98 || align=left | Disc.: Spacewatch || 
|- id="1999 UA66" bgcolor=#E9E9E9
| 0 ||  || MBA-M || 17.7 || 1.2 km || multiple || 1999–2019 || 03 Apr 2019 || 50 || align=left | Disc.: Spacewatch || 
|- id="1999 UB66" bgcolor=#E9E9E9
| 0 ||  || MBA-M || 17.63 || 1.7 km || multiple || 1999–2021 || 26 Nov 2021 || 91 || align=left | Disc.: SDSS || 
|- id="1999 UC66" bgcolor=#d6d6d6
| 0 ||  || MBA-O || 16.75 || 2.5 km || multiple || 1999–2021 || 09 Nov 2021 || 63 || align=left | Disc.: Spacewatch || 
|- id="1999 UD66" bgcolor=#E9E9E9
| 0 ||  || MBA-M || 17.4 || 1.8 km || multiple || 1999–2021 || 09 Jun 2021 || 41 || align=left | Disc.: SDSS || 
|- id="1999 UE66" bgcolor=#E9E9E9
| 0 ||  || MBA-M || 17.80 || 1.5 km || multiple || 1999–2021 || 13 Sep 2021 || 72 || align=left | Disc.: Spacewatch || 
|- id="1999 UF66" bgcolor=#fefefe
| 0 ||  || MBA-I || 18.30 || data-sort-value="0.65" | 650 m || multiple || 1999–2021 || 25 Nov 2021 || 89 || align=left | Disc.: Spacewatch || 
|- id="1999 UG66" bgcolor=#d6d6d6
| 0 ||  || MBA-O || 16.9 || 2.3 km || multiple || 1999–2021 || 03 Dec 2021 || 94 || align=left | Disc.: SpacewatchAlt.: 2010 OH146 || 
|- id="1999 UH66" bgcolor=#fefefe
| 0 ||  || MBA-I || 18.5 || data-sort-value="0.59" | 590 m || multiple || 1999–2020 || 20 Dec 2020 || 63 || align=left | Disc.: Spacewatch || 
|- id="1999 UJ66" bgcolor=#d6d6d6
| 0 ||  || MBA-O || 16.96 || 2.3 km || multiple || 1999–2022 || 27 Jan 2022 || 77 || align=left | Disc.: SDSS || 
|- id="1999 UK66" bgcolor=#E9E9E9
| 0 ||  || MBA-M || 17.84 || data-sort-value="0.80" | 800 m || multiple || 1999–2022 || 26 Jan 2022 || 80 || align=left | Disc.: SDSS || 
|- id="1999 UL66" bgcolor=#fefefe
| 0 ||  || MBA-I || 18.51 || data-sort-value="0.59" | 590 m || multiple || 1999–2020 || 22 Mar 2020 || 105 || align=left | Disc.: Spacewatch || 
|- id="1999 UN66" bgcolor=#d6d6d6
| 0 ||  || MBA-O || 17.64 || 1.7 km || multiple || 1999–2021 || 08 May 2021 || 41 || align=left | Disc.: Spacewatch || 
|- id="1999 UO66" bgcolor=#E9E9E9
| 0 ||  || MBA-M || 18.06 || 1.0 km || multiple || 1995–2022 || 27 Jan 2022 || 73 || align=left | Disc.: SDSS || 
|- id="1999 UP66" bgcolor=#d6d6d6
| 0 ||  || MBA-O || 16.30 || 3.1 km || multiple || 1999–2022 || 25 Jan 2022 || 97 || align=left | Disc.: SDSS || 
|- id="1999 UQ66" bgcolor=#fefefe
| 0 ||  || MBA-I || 18.90 || data-sort-value="0.49" | 490 m || multiple || 1999–2021 || 07 Nov 2021 || 41 || align=left | Disc.: Spacewatch || 
|- id="1999 UR66" bgcolor=#d6d6d6
| 0 ||  || MBA-O || 16.71 || 2.5 km || multiple || 1999–2021 || 08 Nov 2021 || 94 || align=left | Disc.: Spacewatch || 
|- id="1999 US66" bgcolor=#E9E9E9
| 0 ||  || MBA-M || 17.63 || 1.3 km || multiple || 1999–2021 || 08 Nov 2021 || 73 || align=left | Disc.: DB MissingAdded on 22 July 2020 || 
|- id="1999 UT66" bgcolor=#E9E9E9
| 2 ||  || MBA-M || 18.5 || data-sort-value="0.59" | 590 m || multiple || 1999–2019 || 28 Oct 2019 || 27 || align=left | Disc.: SpacewatchAdded on 22 July 2020 || 
|- id="1999 UU66" bgcolor=#fefefe
| 2 ||  || MBA-I || 19.6 || data-sort-value="0.36" | 360 m || multiple || 1999–2020 || 23 Nov 2020 || 56 || align=left | Disc.: SpacewatchAdded on 17 January 2021 || 
|- id="1999 UV66" bgcolor=#d6d6d6
| 0 ||  || MBA-O || 16.84 || 2.4 km || multiple || 1999–2021 || 09 Nov 2021 || 84 || align=left | Disc.: SpacewatchAdded on 17 June 2021 || 
|- id="1999 UW66" bgcolor=#d6d6d6
| 0 ||  || MBA-O || 17.24 || 2.0 km || multiple || 1999–2020 || 08 Oct 2020 || 45 || align=left | Disc.: SpacewatchAdded on 21 August 2021 || 
|- id="1999 UA67" bgcolor=#E9E9E9
| 0 ||  || MBA-M || 18.18 || data-sort-value="0.97" | 970 m || multiple || 1999–2021 || 09 Nov 2021 || 58 || align=left | Disc.: No observationsAdded on 5 November 2021 || 
|}
back to top

V 

|- id="1999 VT" bgcolor=#FFC2E0
| 2 || 1999 VT || AMO || 19.7 || data-sort-value="0.41" | 410 m || multiple || 1999–2019 || 08 Nov 2019 || 175 || align=left | Disc.: CSS || 
|- id="1999 VL1" bgcolor=#FA8072
| 0 ||  || MCA || 19.69 || data-sort-value="0.28" | 410 m || multiple || 1999-2022 || 26 Nov 2022 || 109 || align=left | Disc.: CSS || 
|- id="1999 VL3" bgcolor=#E9E9E9
| 0 ||  || MBA-M || 18.1 || data-sort-value="0.71" | 710 m || multiple || 1999–2021 || 04 Jan 2021 || 85 || align=left | Disc.: SpacewatchAlt.: 2001 FT212 || 
|- id="1999 VQ3" bgcolor=#E9E9E9
| 0 ||  || MBA-M || 18.7 || data-sort-value="0.76" | 760 m || multiple || 1999–2018 || 16 Jan 2018 || 35 || align=left | Disc.: Spacewatch || 
|- id="1999 VQ5" bgcolor=#FA8072
| – ||  || MCA || 19.4 || data-sort-value="0.39" | 390 m || single || 10 days || 14 Nov 1999 || 78 || align=left | Disc.: LINEAR || 
|- id="1999 VR5" bgcolor=#FA8072
| 0 ||  || MCA || 19.08 || data-sort-value="0.45" | 450 m || multiple || 1999–2020 || 05 Jan 2020 || 158 || align=left | Disc.: CSS || 
|- id="1999 VR6" bgcolor=#FFC2E0
| 0 ||  || APO || 20.8 || data-sort-value="0.25" | 250 m || multiple || 1999–2016 || 12 Jun 2016 || 152 || align=left | Disc.: LINEARAlt.: 2012 UV68 || 
|- id="1999 VN11" bgcolor=#FFC2E0
| 7 ||  || AMO || 20.3 || data-sort-value="0.31" | 310 m || single || 8 days || 14 Nov 1999 || 71 || align=left | Disc.: LINEAR || 
|- id="1999 VK12" bgcolor=#FFC2E0
| – ||  || APO || 23.7 || data-sort-value="0.065" | 65 m || single || 3 days || 12 Nov 1999 || 16 || align=left | Disc.: LINEAR || 
|- id="1999 VQ14" bgcolor=#E9E9E9
| 2 ||  || MBA-M || 17.2 || 1.5 km || multiple || 1999–2020 || 05 Nov 2020 || 38 || align=left | Disc.: Kitt Peak || 
|- id="1999 VS14" bgcolor=#E9E9E9
| 0 ||  || MBA-M || 18.41 || data-sort-value="0.87" | 870 m || multiple || 1999–2016 || 25 Oct 2016 || 26 || align=left | Disc.: Kitt Peak Obs.Added on 29 January 2022 || 
|- id="1999 VV15" bgcolor=#fefefe
| 1 ||  || MBA-I || 19.1 || data-sort-value="0.45" | 450 m || multiple || 1999–2020 || 14 Jan 2020 || 34 || align=left | Disc.: SpacewatchAdded on 22 July 2020 || 
|- id="1999 VX15" bgcolor=#FFC2E0
| 0 ||  || AMO || 18.66 || data-sort-value="0.66" | 660 m || multiple || 1999–2021 || 11 May 2021 || 232 || align=left | Disc.: Spacewatch || 
|- id="1999 VY15" bgcolor=#E9E9E9
| 2 ||  || MBA-M || 18.3 || data-sort-value="0.92" | 920 m || multiple || 1999–2020 || 15 Sep 2020 || 48 || align=left | Disc.: Spacewatch || 
|- id="1999 VA16" bgcolor=#fefefe
| 0 ||  || MBA-I || 19.2 || data-sort-value="0.43" | 430 m || multiple || 1999–2018 || 10 Dec 2018 || 51 || align=left | Disc.: SpacewatchAlt.: 2012 DS41 || 
|- id="1999 VB16" bgcolor=#E9E9E9
| 0 ||  = (619185) || MBA-M || 17.3 || 1.9 km || multiple || 1999–2020 || 16 May 2020 || 67 || align=left | Disc.: Spacewatch || 
|- id="1999 VC16" bgcolor=#fefefe
| 2 ||  || MBA-I || 18.7 || data-sort-value="0.54" | 540 m || multiple || 1999–2020 || 16 Nov 2020 || 69 || align=left | Disc.: SpacewatchAlt.: 2006 SN368 || 
|- id="1999 VP16" bgcolor=#d6d6d6
| 0 ||  || MBA-O || 17.32 || 1.9 km || multiple || 1999–2021 || 06 Nov 2021 || 58 || align=left | Disc.: Spacewatch || 
|- id="1999 VZ16" bgcolor=#fefefe
| 0 ||  || MBA-I || 18.9 || data-sort-value="0.49" | 490 m || multiple || 1999–2019 || 02 Jun 2019 || 41 || align=left | Disc.: Spacewatch || 
|- id="1999 VA18" bgcolor=#fefefe
| 2 ||  || MBA-I || 18.4 || data-sort-value="0.62" | 620 m || multiple || 1999–2019 || 01 Nov 2019 || 55 || align=left | Disc.: Spacewatch || 
|- id="1999 VU18" bgcolor=#fefefe
| 0 ||  || MBA-I || 19.59 || data-sort-value="0.36" | 360 m || multiple || 1999–2021 || 30 Nov 2021 || 69 || align=left | Disc.: Spacewatch || 
|- id="1999 VX18" bgcolor=#fefefe
| 0 ||  || MBA-I || 18.28 || data-sort-value="0.66" | 660 m || multiple || 1999–2021 || 17 May 2021 || 87 || align=left | Disc.: Spacewatch || 
|- id="1999 VU25" bgcolor=#FFC2E0
| 7 ||  || AMO || 23.8 || data-sort-value="0.062" | 62 m || single || 4 days || 15 Nov 1999 || 13 || align=left | Disc.: LINEAR || 
|- id="1999 VV25" bgcolor=#FFC2E0
| 7 ||  || APO || 25.1 || data-sort-value="0.034" | 34 m || single || 3 days || 17 Nov 1999 || 27 || align=left | Disc.: LINEAR || 
|- id="1999 VW25" bgcolor=#FFC2E0
| – ||  || ATE || 25.3 || data-sort-value="0.031" | 31 m || single || 3 days || 17 Nov 1999 || 31 || align=left | Disc.: LINEAR || 
|- id="1999 VX25" bgcolor=#FFC2E0
| 7 ||  || ATE || 26.7 || data-sort-value="0.016" | 16 m || single || 5 days || 20 Nov 1999 || 40 || align=left | Disc.: LINEAR || 
|- id="1999 VH27" bgcolor=#d6d6d6
| 0 ||  || MBA-O || 15.88 || 3.7 km || multiple || 1999–2021 || 08 Sep 2021 || 98 || align=left | Disc.: Spacewatch || 
|- id="1999 VX39" bgcolor=#E9E9E9
| – ||  || MBA-M || 18.2 || data-sort-value="0.68" | 680 m || single || 8 days || 12 Nov 1999 || 9 || align=left | Disc.: Spacewatch || 
|- id="1999 VZ39" bgcolor=#E9E9E9
| 0 ||  || MBA-M || 18.0 || data-sort-value="0.75" | 750 m || multiple || 1999–2021 || 04 Jan 2021 || 53 || align=left | Disc.: Spacewatch || 
|- id="1999 VA40" bgcolor=#fefefe
| 0 ||  || MBA-I || 17.53 || data-sort-value="0.93" | 930 m || multiple || 1999–2021 || 11 May 2021 || 93 || align=left | Disc.: SpacewatchAlt.: 2003 WK191 || 
|- id="1999 VB41" bgcolor=#fefefe
| 3 ||  || MBA-I || 19.0 || data-sort-value="0.47" | 470 m || multiple || 1999–2020 || 26 Sep 2020 || 40 || align=left | Disc.: SpacewatchAlt.: 2020 PJ36 || 
|- id="1999 VZ41" bgcolor=#E9E9E9
| 0 ||  || MBA-M || 17.4 || 1.8 km || multiple || 1999–2020 || 28 Apr 2020 || 67 || align=left | Disc.: SpacewatchAlt.: 2011 HL92, 2015 CD23 || 
|- id="1999 VO42" bgcolor=#E9E9E9
| 0 ||  || MBA-M || 17.9 || 1.1 km || multiple || 1999–2020 || 17 Nov 2020 || 99 || align=left | Disc.: SpacewatchAlt.: 2008 YT96 || 
|- id="1999 VZ42" bgcolor=#E9E9E9
| 1 ||  || MBA-M || 18.4 || data-sort-value="0.62" | 620 m || multiple || 1999–2021 || 18 Jan 2021 || 56 || align=left | Disc.: Spacewatch || 
|- id="1999 VA46" bgcolor=#E9E9E9
| 0 ||  || MBA-M || 17.4 || data-sort-value="0.98" | 980 m || multiple || 1999–2021 || 14 Jan 2021 || 184 || align=left | Disc.: LINEAR || 
|- id="1999 VH47" bgcolor=#E9E9E9
| 1 ||  || MBA-M || 16.6 || 2.6 km || multiple || 1999-2022 || 25 Mar 2022 || 182 || align=left | Disc.: LINEAR Alt.: 2006 HD160 || 
|- id="1999 VZ72" bgcolor=#fefefe
| 1 ||  || MBA-I || 17.15 || 1.1 km || multiple || 1995–2021 || 09 May 2021 || 123 || align=left | Disc.: LINEAR || 
|- id="1999 VF73" bgcolor=#FA8072
| 0 ||  || MCA || 19.9 || data-sort-value="0.44" | 440 m || multiple || 1999–2020 || 12 Sep 2020 || 70 || align=left | Disc.: SpacewatchAlt.: 2013 AG150 || 
|- id="1999 VZ73" bgcolor=#d6d6d6
| 0 ||  || MBA-O || 16.89 || 2.3 km || multiple || 1999–2021 || 24 Nov 2021 || 102 || align=left | Disc.: Spacewatch || 
|- id="1999 VM74" bgcolor=#FA8072
| 3 ||  || MCA || 19.4 || data-sort-value="0.55" | 550 m || multiple || 1999–2020 || 23 Nov 2020 || 33 || align=left | Disc.: SpacewatchAdded on 17 June 2021Alt.: 2020 TJ43 || 
|- id="1999 VH75" bgcolor=#E9E9E9
| 0 ||  || MBA-M || 17.7 || data-sort-value="0.86" | 860 m || multiple || 1999–2020 || 14 Dec 2020 || 76 || align=left | Disc.: Spacewatch || 
|- id="1999 VK75" bgcolor=#E9E9E9
| 0 ||  || MBA-M || 17.44 || 1.4 km || multiple || 1999–2021 || 30 Nov 2021 || 128 || align=left | Disc.: Spacewatch || 
|- id="1999 VL75" bgcolor=#fefefe
| 0 ||  || MBA-I || 18.2 || data-sort-value="0.68" | 680 m || multiple || 1999–2021 || 15 Jan 2021 || 75 || align=left | Disc.: SpacewatchAlt.: 2009 SM152 || 
|- id="1999 VU75" bgcolor=#fefefe
| 0 ||  || MBA-I || 18.64 || data-sort-value="0.56" | 560 m || multiple || 1999–2021 || 08 Sep 2021 || 57 || align=left | Disc.: SpacewatchAlt.: 2014 WT154 || 
|- id="1999 VE76" bgcolor=#d6d6d6
| 1 ||  || HIL || 16.8 || 2.4 km || multiple || 1999–2015 || 06 Dec 2015 || 28 || align=left | Disc.: Spacewatch || 
|- id="1999 VL76" bgcolor=#d6d6d6
| 0 ||  || MBA-O || 16.65 || 2.6 km || multiple || 1999–2021 || 29 Apr 2021 || 107 || align=left | Disc.: Spacewatch || 
|- id="1999 VE83" bgcolor=#d6d6d6
| 0 ||  || MBA-O || 17.01 || 2.2 km || multiple || 1999–2021 || 03 May 2021 || 97 || align=left | Disc.: Spacewatch || 
|- id="1999 VS83" bgcolor=#fefefe
| 0 ||  || MBA-I || 18.6 || data-sort-value="0.57" | 570 m || multiple || 1999–2019 || 28 Aug 2019 || 73 || align=left | Disc.: SpacewatchAlt.: 2009 QM40 || 
|- id="1999 VX83" bgcolor=#fefefe
| 2 ||  || MBA-I || 19.6 || data-sort-value="0.36" | 360 m || multiple || 1999–2020 || 17 Oct 2020 || 61 || align=left | Disc.: Spacewatch || 
|- id="1999 VK84" bgcolor=#E9E9E9
| 0 ||  || MBA-M || 18.8 || data-sort-value="0.52" | 520 m || multiple || 1999–2021 || 07 Feb 2021 || 52 || align=left | Disc.: SpacewatchAdded on 21 August 2021 || 
|- id="1999 VM84" bgcolor=#fefefe
| 0 ||  || MBA-I || 18.62 || data-sort-value="0.56" | 560 m || multiple || 1997–2021 || 15 Apr 2021 || 106 || align=left | Disc.: SpacewatchAlt.: 2011 FX59 || 
|- id="1999 VN84" bgcolor=#d6d6d6
| 1 ||  || MBA-O || 17.8 || 1.5 km || multiple || 1999–2020 || 11 Oct 2020 || 54 || align=left | Disc.: SpacewatchAdded on 17 January 2021 || 
|- id="1999 VF87" bgcolor=#FA8072
| 0 ||  || MCA || 17.64 || data-sort-value="0.88" | 880 m || multiple || 1999–2021 || 08 May 2021 || 104 || align=left | Disc.: CSS || 
|- id="1999 VS91" bgcolor=#FA8072
| 0 ||  || MCA || 17.6 || data-sort-value="0.90" | 900 m || multiple || 1999–2021 || 17 Jan 2021 || 101 || align=left | Disc.: LINEAR || 
|- id="1999 VS92" bgcolor=#E9E9E9
| 2 ||  || MBA-M || 17.8 || data-sort-value="0.82" | 820 m || multiple || 1999–2021 || 23 Jan 2021 || 67 || align=left | Disc.: LINEAR || 
|- id="1999 VF99" bgcolor=#d6d6d6
| 0 ||  || MBA-O || 16.0 || 3.5 km || multiple || 1999–2020 || 25 May 2020 || 82 || align=left | Disc.: LINEARAlt.: 2010 KC124 || 
|- id="1999 VU99" bgcolor=#d6d6d6
| 0 ||  || MBA-O || 16.48 || 2.8 km || multiple || 1999–2021 || 26 Nov 2021 || 152 || align=left | Disc.: LINEARAlt.: 2010 ON31 || 
|- id="1999 VU106" bgcolor=#fefefe
| 1 ||  || MBA-I || 17.9 || data-sort-value="0.78" | 780 m || multiple || 1999–2020 || 22 Dec 2020 || 98 || align=left | Disc.: LINEARAlt.: 2016 SH16 || 
|- id="1999 VS115" bgcolor=#fefefe
| 0 ||  || MBA-I || 18.6 || data-sort-value="0.57" | 570 m || multiple || 1999–2018 || 15 Dec 2018 || 62 || align=left | Disc.: SpacewatchAlt.: 2014 RF72 || 
|- id="1999 VV115" bgcolor=#fefefe
| 1 ||  || MBA-I || 18.9 || data-sort-value="0.49" | 490 m || multiple || 1999–2019 || 28 Aug 2019 || 51 || align=left | Disc.: SpacewatchAlt.: 2009 ST79 || 
|- id="1999 VY115" bgcolor=#fefefe
| 0 ||  || MBA-I || 17.50 || data-sort-value="0.94" | 940 m || multiple || 1999–2021 || 15 Apr 2021 || 77 || align=left | Disc.: SpacewatchAlt.: 2003 XJ23 || 
|- id="1999 VM116" bgcolor=#E9E9E9
| 0 ||  || MBA-M || 18.4 || data-sort-value="0.88" | 880 m || multiple || 1996–2021 || 30 Nov 2021 || 46 || align=left | Disc.: SpacewatchAdded on 24 December 2021 || 
|- id="1999 VP118" bgcolor=#E9E9E9
| 3 ||  || MBA-M || 19.2 || data-sort-value="0.43" | 430 m || multiple || 1999–2021 || 07 Jan 2021 || 31 || align=left | Disc.: Spacewatch || 
|- id="1999 VT118" bgcolor=#d6d6d6
| 0 ||  || MBA-O || 16.7 || 2.5 km || multiple || 1999–2020 || 17 Dec 2020 || 113 || align=left | Disc.: Spacewatch || 
|- id="1999 VU118" bgcolor=#d6d6d6
| 0 ||  || MBA-O || 17.81 || 1.5 km || multiple || 1999–2022 || 04 Jan 2022 || 50 || align=left | Disc.: SpacewatchAlt.: 2015 UX37 || 
|- id="1999 VX118" bgcolor=#d6d6d6
| 0 ||  || MBA-O || 16.35 || 3.0 km || multiple || 1999–2021 || 27 Nov 2021 || 155 || align=left | Disc.: SpacewatchAlt.: 2015 PF281 || 
|- id="1999 VZ119" bgcolor=#fefefe
| 0 ||  || MBA-I || 18.38 || data-sort-value="0.63" | 630 m || multiple || 1999–2021 || 13 May 2021 || 80 || align=left | Disc.: Spacewatch || 
|- id="1999 VO120" bgcolor=#fefefe
| 0 ||  || MBA-I || 18.95 || data-sort-value="0.48" | 480 m || multiple || 1999–2022 || 25 Jan 2022 || 46 || align=left | Disc.: Spacewatch || 
|- id="1999 VJ121" bgcolor=#fefefe
| 0 ||  || MBA-I || 18.27 || data-sort-value="0.66" | 660 m || multiple || 1999–2021 || 14 Nov 2021 || 101 || align=left | Disc.: SpacewatchAlt.: 2006 QM140 || 
|- id="1999 VN121" bgcolor=#E9E9E9
| 1 ||  || MBA-M || 19.3 || data-sort-value="0.58" | 580 m || multiple || 1999–2021 || 26 Oct 2021 || 30 || align=left | Disc.: SpacewatchAdded on 29 January 2022 || 
|- id="1999 VO121" bgcolor=#d6d6d6
| 0 ||  || MBA-O || 18.07 || 1.3 km || multiple || 1999-2021 || 09 Dec 2021 || 53 || align=left | Disc.: Spacewatch || 
|- id="1999 VS121" bgcolor=#fefefe
| 0 ||  || MBA-I || 18.6 || data-sort-value="0.57" | 570 m || multiple || 1999–2021 || 17 Jan 2021 || 59 || align=left | Disc.: Spacewatch || 
|- id="1999 VU121" bgcolor=#d6d6d6
| 0 ||  || MBA-O || 17.06 || 2.2 km || multiple || 1999–2021 || 03 Aug 2021 || 51 || align=left | Disc.: SpacewatchAlt.: 2005 WQ25 || 
|- id="1999 VC122" bgcolor=#fefefe
| 0 ||  || MBA-I || 19.2 || data-sort-value="0.39" | 430 m || multiple || 1999-2018 || 07 Aug 2018 || 58 || align=left | Disc.: Spacewatch || 
|- id="1999 VL122" bgcolor=#E9E9E9
| 0 ||  || MBA-M || 17.4 || data-sort-value="0.98" | 980 m || multiple || 1999–2019 || 06 Jul 2019 || 55 || align=left | Disc.: SpacewatchAlt.: 2014 HE152, 2015 OR61 || 
|- id="1999 VS122" bgcolor=#E9E9E9
| 0 ||  || MBA-M || 17.9 || data-sort-value="0.78" | 780 m || multiple || 1999–2020 || 23 Dec 2020 || 49 || align=left | Disc.: Spacewatch || 
|- id="1999 VJ123" bgcolor=#d6d6d6
| 0 ||  || MBA-O || 18.1 || 1.3 km || multiple || 1999–2020 || 17 Oct 2020 || 62 || align=left | Disc.: SpacewatchAlt.: 2015 XY302 || 
|- id="1999 VN123" bgcolor=#E9E9E9
| 0 ||  || MBA-M || 18.0 || 1.1 km || multiple || 1999–2021 || 15 Jan 2021 || 78 || align=left | Disc.: SpacewatchAlt.: 2003 UF6 || 
|- id="1999 VE124" bgcolor=#d6d6d6
| 0 ||  || MBA-O || 16.61 || 2.7 km || multiple || 1999–2021 || 30 Oct 2021 || 158 || align=left | Disc.: SpacewatchAlt.: 2010 TT63 || 
|- id="1999 VH125" bgcolor=#d6d6d6
| 3 ||  || MBA-O || 17.4 || 1.8 km || multiple || 1999–2020 || 23 Nov 2020 || 24 || align=left | Disc.: SpacewatchAdded on 17 January 2021 || 
|- id="1999 VN125" bgcolor=#E9E9E9
| 1 ||  || MBA-M || 19.0 || data-sort-value="0.47" | 470 m || multiple || 1999–2020 || 07 Dec 2020 || 32 || align=left | Disc.: Spacewatch || 
|- id="1999 VB128" bgcolor=#d6d6d6
| 0 ||  || MBA-O || 17.12 || 2.1 km || multiple || 1999–2022 || 25 Jan 2022 || 87 || align=left | Disc.: SpacewatchAdded on 9 March 2021Alt.: 2020 TF21 || 
|- id="1999 VG128" bgcolor=#E9E9E9
| 2 ||  || MBA-M || 18.0 || 1.4 km || multiple || 1999–2017 || 24 Oct 2017 || 57 || align=left | Disc.: SpacewatchAlt.: 2008 SX189 || 
|- id="1999 VM128" bgcolor=#E9E9E9
| 0 ||  || MBA-M || 17.4 || 1.4 km || multiple || 1999–2021 || 09 Dec 2021 || 163 || align=left | Disc.: SpacewatchAlt.: 2014 EZ23, 2019 JX30 || 
|- id="1999 VV128" bgcolor=#fefefe
| 0 ||  || MBA-I || 18.53 || data-sort-value="0.58" | 580 m || multiple || 1999–2021 || 01 Nov 2021 || 95 || align=left | Disc.: SpacewatchAdded on 21 August 2021Alt.: 2008 DK74 || 
|- id="1999 VW128" bgcolor=#E9E9E9
| 0 ||  || MBA-M || 18.00 || 1.4 km || multiple || 1999–2021 || 13 Sep 2021 || 30 || align=left | Disc.: Spacewatch || 
|- id="1999 VZ128" bgcolor=#d6d6d6
| 0 ||  || MBA-O || 17.28 || 1.9 km || multiple || 1999–2021 || 09 Apr 2021 || 55 || align=left | Disc.: SpacewatchAlt.: 2018 VU30 || 
|- id="1999 VB129" bgcolor=#d6d6d6
| 0 ||  || MBA-O || 16.24 || 3.1 km || multiple || 1998–2021 || 11 Jul 2021 || 165 || align=left | Disc.: SpacewatchAlt.: 2010 VK68 || 
|- id="1999 VL129" bgcolor=#fefefe
| 1 ||  || MBA-I || 18.5 || data-sort-value="0.59" | 590 m || multiple || 1999–2019 || 27 Oct 2019 || 90 || align=left | Disc.: Spacewatch || 
|- id="1999 VU129" bgcolor=#d6d6d6
| 0 ||  || MBA-O || 16.8 || 2.4 km || multiple || 1999–2020 || 04 Dec 2020 || 50 || align=left | Disc.: SpacewatchAdded on 17 January 2021Alt.: 2014 QZ160 || 
|- id="1999 VZ129" bgcolor=#fefefe
| 0 ||  || MBA-I || 17.83 || data-sort-value="0.81" | 810 m || multiple || 1993–2021 || 08 May 2021 || 88 || align=left | Disc.: Spacewatch || 
|- id="1999 VW130" bgcolor=#E9E9E9
| 0 ||  || MBA-M || 17.7 || 1.6 km || multiple || 1999–2020 || 16 Mar 2020 || 51 || align=left | Disc.: Spacewatch || 
|- id="1999 VF131" bgcolor=#fefefe
| 0 ||  || MBA-I || 18.28 || data-sort-value="0.66" | 660 m || multiple || 1999–2021 || 25 Nov 2021 || 108 || align=left | Disc.: SpacewatchAlt.: 2006 UH362 || 
|- id="1999 VM131" bgcolor=#d6d6d6
| 2 ||  || MBA-O || 17.9 || 1.5 km || multiple || 1999–2020 || 22 Jan 2020 || 95 || align=left | Disc.: Spacewatch || 
|- id="1999 VY131" bgcolor=#fefefe
| 0 ||  || MBA-I || 18.72 || data-sort-value="0.54" | 540 m || multiple || 1999–2021 || 09 Nov 2021 || 65 || align=left | Disc.: SpacewatchAdded on 5 November 2021 || 
|- id="1999 VF132" bgcolor=#E9E9E9
| 0 ||  || MBA-M || 17.79 || 1.5 km || multiple || 1999–2021 || 31 Aug 2021 || 70 || align=left | Disc.: SpacewatchAdded on 22 July 2020Alt.: 2010 CK23, 2019 AS34 || 
|- id="1999 VP132" bgcolor=#d6d6d6
| 0 ||  || MBA-O || 17.30 || 1.9 km || multiple || 1999–2020 || 14 Nov 2020 || 88 || align=left | Disc.: Spacewatch || 
|- id="1999 VJ133" bgcolor=#E9E9E9
| 0 ||  || MBA-M || 18.28 || 1.2 km || multiple || 1999–2021 || 29 Oct 2021 || 95 || align=left | Disc.: Spacewatch || 
|- id="1999 VJ134" bgcolor=#E9E9E9
| 0 ||  || MBA-M || 17.1 || 1.1 km || multiple || 1999–2021 || 11 Jan 2021 || 136 || align=left | Disc.: Spacewatch || 
|- id="1999 VS134" bgcolor=#E9E9E9
| 2 ||  || MBA-M || 18.3 || data-sort-value="0.92" | 920 m || multiple || 1999–2020 || 08 Dec 2020 || 47 || align=left | Disc.: SpacewatchAdded on 11 May 2021Alt.: 2016 WN66 || 
|- id="1999 VT134" bgcolor=#d6d6d6
| 0 ||  || MBA-O || 18.1 || 1.3 km || multiple || 1999–2020 || 05 Nov 2020 || 39 || align=left | Disc.: SpacewatchAdded on 17 January 2021 || 
|- id="1999 VE135" bgcolor=#E9E9E9
| 1 ||  || MBA-M || 18.9 || data-sort-value="0.70" | 700 m || multiple || 1999–2016 || 06 Oct 2016 || 24 || align=left | Disc.: Spacewatch || 
|- id="1999 VR137" bgcolor=#d6d6d6
| 0 ||  || MBA-O || 16.4 || 2.9 km || multiple || 1999–2021 || 08 Sep 2021 || 90 || align=left | Disc.: LINEAR || 
|- id="1999 VL138" bgcolor=#E9E9E9
| 0 ||  || MBA-M || 17.9 || 1.1 km || multiple || 1999–2021 || 07 Jan 2021 || 80 || align=left | Disc.: Spacewatch || 
|- id="1999 VO139" bgcolor=#fefefe
| 2 ||  || MBA-I || 19.8 || data-sort-value="0.33" | 330 m || multiple || 1999–2020 || 05 Nov 2020 || 48 || align=left | Disc.: SpacewatchAlt.: 2020 RD44 || 
|- id="1999 VX139" bgcolor=#d6d6d6
| 1 ||  || MBA-O || 17.60 || 1.7 km || multiple || 1999–2021 || 06 Nov 2021 || 48 || align=left | Disc.: SpacewatchAdded on 5 November 2021 || 
|- id="1999 VN140" bgcolor=#d6d6d6
| 1 ||  || MBA-O || 17.4 || 1.8 km || multiple || 1999–2015 || 19 Dec 2015 || 36 || align=left | Disc.: SpacewatchAlt.: 2007 VA256 || 
|- id="1999 VK141" bgcolor=#d6d6d6
| 0 ||  || MBA-O || 16.8 || 2.4 km || multiple || 1999–2021 || 30 Nov 2021 || 60 || align=left | Disc.: SpacewatchAdded on 29 January 2022 || 
|- id="1999 VA142" bgcolor=#E9E9E9
| 0 ||  || MBA-M || 18.32 || data-sort-value="0.91" | 910 m || multiple || 1999–2020 || 16 Nov 2020 || 83 || align=left | Disc.: SpacewatchAlt.: 2016 TH88 || 
|- id="1999 VE142" bgcolor=#E9E9E9
| 0 ||  || MBA-M || 18.0 || data-sort-value="0.75" | 750 m || multiple || 1999–2020 || 09 Dec 2020 || 44 || align=left | Disc.: SpacewatchAdded on 9 March 2021Alt.: 2015 PK189 || 
|- id="1999 VF142" bgcolor=#E9E9E9
| 0 ||  || MBA-M || 17.68 || data-sort-value="0.87" | 870 m || multiple || 1999–2021 || 06 Jan 2021 || 120 || align=left | Disc.: SpacewatchAdded on 22 July 2020Alt.: 2015 PB120 || 
|- id="1999 VR142" bgcolor=#fefefe
| 0 ||  || MBA-I || 18.76 || data-sort-value="0.53" | 530 m || multiple || 1999–2021 || 06 Apr 2021 || 51 || align=left | Disc.: SpacewatchAlt.: 2009 WV132 || 
|- id="1999 VL147" bgcolor=#E9E9E9
| 0 ||  || MBA-M || 17.4 || 1.4 km || multiple || 1999–2021 || 11 Jan 2021 || 163 || align=left | Disc.: LINEAR || 
|- id="1999 VA152" bgcolor=#fefefe
| 0 ||  || MBA-I || 18.17 || data-sort-value="0.69" | 690 m || multiple || 1999–2022 || 25 Jan 2022 || 112 || align=left | Disc.: SpacewatchAdded on 30 September 2021Alt.: 2002 NA81, 2015 BN326 || 
|- id="1999 VJ152" bgcolor=#E9E9E9
| 1 ||  || MBA-M || 19.1 || data-sort-value="0.64" | 640 m || multiple || 1999–2020 || 10 Oct 2020 || 46 || align=left | Disc.: SpacewatchAlt.: 2016 WO64 || 
|- id="1999 VR152" bgcolor=#E9E9E9
| 1 ||  || MBA-M || 17.9 || 1.1 km || multiple || 1999–2020 || 16 Nov 2020 || 52 || align=left | Disc.: SpacewatchAdded on 17 January 2021 || 
|- id="1999 VS152" bgcolor=#d6d6d6
| 2 ||  || MBA-O || 17.9 || 1.5 km || multiple || 1999–2019 || 03 Dec 2019 || 33 || align=left | Disc.: SpacewatchAdded on 11 May 2021Alt.: 2019 VP14 || 
|- id="1999 VR153" bgcolor=#E9E9E9
| 0 ||  || MBA-M || 17.39 || 1.9 km || multiple || 1999–2021 || 12 May 2021 || 64 || align=left | Disc.: Spacewatch || 
|- id="1999 VF154" bgcolor=#E9E9E9
| 0 ||  || MBA-M || 17.3 || 1.0 km || multiple || 1999–2021 || 16 Jan 2021 || 72 || align=left | Disc.: SpacewatchAlt.: 2015 TG340, 2017 BK113 || 
|- id="1999 VS174" bgcolor=#fefefe
| 0 ||  || MBA-I || 18.8 || data-sort-value="0.52" | 520 m || multiple || 1999–2017 || 15 Dec 2017 || 47 || align=left | Disc.: SpacewatchAlt.: 2010 XD91 || 
|- id="1999 VU174" bgcolor=#fefefe
| 0 ||  || MBA-I || 19.0 || data-sort-value="0.47" | 470 m || multiple || 1999–2021 || 06 Nov 2021 || 70 || align=left | Disc.: Spacewatch || 
|- id="1999 VC175" bgcolor=#fefefe
| 0 ||  || MBA-I || 18.48 || data-sort-value="0.60" | 600 m || multiple || 1999–2021 || 03 May 2021 || 88 || align=left | Disc.: Spacewatch || 
|- id="1999 VD175" bgcolor=#fefefe
| 0 ||  || MBA-I || 18.2 || data-sort-value="0.68" | 680 m || multiple || 1999–2021 || 12 Jan 2021 || 69 || align=left | Disc.: SpacewatchAlt.: 2009 SV145 || 
|- id="1999 VO175" bgcolor=#d6d6d6
| 0 ||  || MBA-O || 16.55 || 2.7 km || multiple || 1999–2021 || 04 Oct 2021 || 80 || align=left | Disc.: Spacewatch || 
|- id="1999 VU175" bgcolor=#E9E9E9
| – ||  || MBA-M || 18.8 || data-sort-value="0.52" | 520 m || single || 16 days || 28 Nov 1999 || 12 || align=left | Disc.: Spacewatch || 
|- id="1999 VW207" bgcolor=#E9E9E9
| 0 ||  || MBA-M || 17.30 || 1.5 km || multiple || 1999–2022 || 27 Jan 2022 || 157 || align=left | Disc.: Spacewatch || 
|- id="1999 VF209" bgcolor=#E9E9E9
| 1 ||  || MBA-M || 17.3 || 1.0 km || multiple || 1999–2020 || 23 Dec 2020 || 56 || align=left | Disc.: LINEARAdded on 11 May 2021Alt.: 2019 GP80 || 
|- id="1999 VH210" bgcolor=#E9E9E9
| 1 ||  || MBA-M || 17.5 || data-sort-value="0.94" | 940 m || multiple || 1999–2021 || 14 Jan 2021 || 53 || align=left | Disc.: LINEARAdded on 17 January 2021 || 
|- id="1999 VU211" bgcolor=#fefefe
| 0 ||  || MBA-I || 18.89 || data-sort-value="0.50" | 500 m || multiple || 1999–2021 || 24 Nov 2021 || 127 || align=left | Disc.: LINEARAlt.: 2013 BF53, 2018 VV65 || 
|- id="1999 VN212" bgcolor=#E9E9E9
| 0 ||  || MBA-M || 17.23 || 1.1 km || multiple || 1999–2021 || 06 May 2021 || 184 || align=left | Disc.: LINEARAlt.: 2015 VM80 || 
|- id="1999 VX213" bgcolor=#FA8072
| 1 ||  || HUN || 18.9 || data-sort-value="0.49" | 490 m || multiple || 1999–2021 || 08 Jun 2021 || 45 || align=left | Disc.: LINEARAdded on 17 June 2021 || 
|- id="1999 VF214" bgcolor=#fefefe
| 0 ||  = (619186) || MBA-I || 18.7 || data-sort-value="0.54" | 540 m || multiple || 1999–2021 || 08 May 2021 || 45 || align=left | Disc.: SpacewatchAdded on 19 October 2020Alt.: 2009 US107 || 
|- id="1999 VP214" bgcolor=#E9E9E9
| 0 ||  || MBA-M || 17.8 || 1.5 km || multiple || 1999–2021 || 13 Jul 2021 || 53 || align=left | Disc.: Spacewatch || 
|- id="1999 VR214" bgcolor=#d6d6d6
| 0 ||  || MBA-O || 16.7 || 2.5 km || multiple || 1999–2020 || 16 Dec 2020 || 60 || align=left | Disc.: SpacewatchAlt.: 2013 JY50 || 
|- id="1999 VX214" bgcolor=#E9E9E9
| 0 ||  || MBA-M || 16.9 || 2.3 km || multiple || 1999–2021 || 08 Jun 2021 || 110 || align=left | Disc.: SpacewatchAdded on 22 July 2020Alt.: 2015 BW357, 2015 CQ78 || 
|- id="1999 VB215" bgcolor=#E9E9E9
| 2 ||  || MBA-M || 18.9 || data-sort-value="0.49" | 490 m || multiple || 1999–2019 || 28 Nov 2019 || 48 || align=left | Disc.: SpacewatchAlt.: 2007 TU389 || 
|- id="1999 VE215" bgcolor=#E9E9E9
| 0 ||  || MBA-M || 18.7 || data-sort-value="0.76" | 760 m || multiple || 1999–2020 || 21 Oct 2020 || 67 || align=left | Disc.: Spacewatch || 
|- id="1999 VR216" bgcolor=#fefefe
| 0 ||  || MBA-I || 18.5 || data-sort-value="0.59" | 590 m || multiple || 1999–2018 || 15 Oct 2018 || 54 || align=left | Disc.: SpacewatchAlt.: 2014 QL341 || 
|- id="1999 VA217" bgcolor=#E9E9E9
| 2 ||  || MBA-M || 18.4 || data-sort-value="0.62" | 620 m || multiple || 1999–2021 || 08 Jan 2021 || 27 || align=left | Disc.: SpacewatchAdded on 9 March 2021Alt.: 2007 RL18 || 
|- id="1999 VE217" bgcolor=#E9E9E9
| 0 ||  || MBA-M || 17.30 || 1.5 km || multiple || 1999–2021 || 30 Nov 2021 || 116 || align=left | Disc.: SpacewatchAlt.: 2016 PO58 || 
|- id="1999 VX217" bgcolor=#fefefe
| 2 ||  || MBA-I || 19.4 || data-sort-value="0.39" | 390 m || multiple || 1999–2019 || 27 Oct 2019 || 41 || align=left | Disc.: SpacewatchAdded on 17 January 2021Alt.: 2009 SK406, 2019 SK62 || 
|- id="1999 VY217" bgcolor=#d6d6d6
| 0 ||  || MBA-O || 16.87 || 2.4 km || multiple || 1999–2021 || 30 Nov 2021 || 91 || align=left | Disc.: Spacewatch || 
|- id="1999 VD218" bgcolor=#d6d6d6
| 0 ||  || MBA-O || 16.5 || 2.8 km || multiple || 1999–2020 || 10 Nov 2020 || 175 || align=left | Disc.: SpacewatchAlt.: 2008 GK10 || 
|- id="1999 VJ218" bgcolor=#E9E9E9
| 0 ||  || MBA-M || 17.40 || 1.8 km || multiple || 1999–2021 || 17 May 2021 || 115 || align=left | Disc.: Spacewatch || 
|- id="1999 VK218" bgcolor=#E9E9E9
| 0 ||  || MBA-M || 16.7 || 2.5 km || multiple || 1999–2020 || 27 Apr 2020 || 62 || align=left | Disc.: SpacewatchAdded on 22 July 2020 || 
|- id="1999 VO219" bgcolor=#E9E9E9
| 0 ||  || MBA-M || 18.02 || data-sort-value="0.74" | 740 m || multiple || 1999–2021 || 17 Apr 2021 || 111 || align=left | Disc.: Spacewatch || 
|- id="1999 VW220" bgcolor=#E9E9E9
| 0 ||  || MBA-M || 17.48 || 1.3 km || multiple || 1999–2022 || 22 Jan 2022 || 105 || align=left | Disc.: Spacewatch || 
|- id="1999 VV221" bgcolor=#E9E9E9
| 0 ||  || MBA-M || 18.56 || data-sort-value="0.82" | 820 m || multiple || 1999–2021 || 30 Nov 2021 || 64 || align=left | Disc.: Spacewatch || 
|- id="1999 VM222" bgcolor=#E9E9E9
| 1 ||  || MBA-M || 18.1 || 1.3 km || multiple || 1999–2017 || 25 Oct 2017 || 32 || align=left | Disc.: Spacewatch || 
|- id="1999 VP224" bgcolor=#fefefe
| 0 ||  || MBA-I || 18.3 || data-sort-value="0.65" | 650 m || multiple || 1999–2019 || 28 Jun 2019 || 83 || align=left | Disc.: SpacewatchAlt.: 2009 SQ81, 2015 HS133 || 
|- id="1999 VA226" bgcolor=#E9E9E9
| 1 ||  || MBA-M || 18.2 || data-sort-value="0.96" | 960 m || multiple || 1999–2020 || 13 Sep 2020 || 49 || align=left | Disc.: SpacewatchAlt.: 2003 SG239 || 
|- id="1999 VB226" bgcolor=#d6d6d6
| 0 ||  || MBA-O || 17.41 || 1.8 km || multiple || 1999–2020 || 14 Dec 2020 || 55 || align=left | Disc.: Spacewatch || 
|- id="1999 VE226" bgcolor=#d6d6d6
| 0 ||  || MBA-O || 16.21 || 3.2 km || multiple || 1999–2022 || 16 Jan 2022 || 122 || align=left | Disc.: LINEAR || 
|- id="1999 VN228" bgcolor=#fefefe
| 2 ||  || MBA-I || 18.7 || data-sort-value="0.54" | 540 m || multiple || 1995–2020 || 25 Jan 2020 || 35 || align=left | Disc.: Spacewatch || 
|- id="1999 VN231" bgcolor=#E9E9E9
| 0 ||  || MBA-M || 18.1 || data-sort-value="0.71" | 710 m || multiple || 1999–2020 || 10 Dec 2020 || 55 || align=left | Disc.: Spacewatch || 
|- id="1999 VZ231" bgcolor=#E9E9E9
| 0 ||  || MBA-M || 17.5 || 1.3 km || multiple || 1999–2020 || 11 Oct 2020 || 104 || align=left | Disc.: Spacewatch || 
|- id="1999 VA232" bgcolor=#E9E9E9
| 0 ||  || MBA-M || 16.7 || 1.9 km || multiple || 1999–2020 || 06 Dec 2020 || 128 || align=left | Disc.: Spacewatch || 
|- id="1999 VB232" bgcolor=#d6d6d6
| 0 ||  || MBA-O || 16.74 || 2.5 km || multiple || 1999–2021 || 24 Nov 2021 || 110 || align=left | Disc.: Spacewatch || 
|- id="1999 VC232" bgcolor=#fefefe
| 0 ||  || MBA-I || 18.19 || data-sort-value="0.68" | 680 m || multiple || 1999–2021 || 01 May 2021 || 134 || align=left | Disc.: Spacewatch || 
|- id="1999 VE232" bgcolor=#d6d6d6
| 0 ||  || MBA-O || 16.64 || 2.6 km || multiple || 1999–2021 || 09 Sep 2021 || 72 || align=left | Disc.: Kitt Peak || 
|- id="1999 VF232" bgcolor=#fefefe
| 0 ||  || MBA-I || 17.7 || data-sort-value="0.86" | 860 m || multiple || 1999–2020 || 06 Dec 2020 || 128 || align=left | Disc.: Spacewatch || 
|- id="1999 VH232" bgcolor=#E9E9E9
| 0 ||  || MBA-M || 17.43 || 1.8 km || multiple || 1999–2021 || 09 Aug 2021 || 73 || align=left | Disc.: Spacewatch || 
|- id="1999 VJ232" bgcolor=#fefefe
| 0 ||  || MBA-I || 18.1 || data-sort-value="0.71" | 710 m || multiple || 1999–2020 || 20 Dec 2020 || 109 || align=left | Disc.: Spacewatch || 
|- id="1999 VK232" bgcolor=#d6d6d6
| 0 ||  || MBA-O || 16.1 || 3.4 km || multiple || 1999–2021 || 07 Jan 2021 || 113 || align=left | Disc.: Spacewatch || 
|- id="1999 VL232" bgcolor=#fefefe
| 0 ||  || MBA-I || 18.0 || data-sort-value="0.75" | 750 m || multiple || 1999–2020 || 11 Dec 2020 || 82 || align=left | Disc.: Spacewatch || 
|- id="1999 VM232" bgcolor=#d6d6d6
| 0 ||  || MBA-O || 16.37 || 3.0 km || multiple || 1999–2021 || 08 Aug 2021 || 66 || align=left | Disc.: SpacewatchAlt.: 2010 MQ11 || 
|- id="1999 VN232" bgcolor=#fefefe
| 0 ||  || MBA-I || 18.40 || data-sort-value="0.62" | 620 m || multiple || 1999–2021 || 18 Mar 2021 || 83 || align=left | Disc.: Spacewatch || 
|- id="1999 VO232" bgcolor=#E9E9E9
| 0 ||  || MBA-M || 17.97 || 1.1 km || multiple || 1999–2021 || 02 Oct 2021 || 67 || align=left | Disc.: Spacewatch || 
|- id="1999 VP232" bgcolor=#fefefe
| 0 ||  || MBA-I || 18.5 || data-sort-value="0.59" | 590 m || multiple || 1999–2020 || 11 Dec 2020 || 75 || align=left | Disc.: Spacewatch || 
|- id="1999 VQ232" bgcolor=#d6d6d6
| 0 ||  || MBA-O || 17.05 || 2.2 km || multiple || 1999–2021 || 08 Dec 2021 || 85 || align=left | Disc.: Spacewatch || 
|- id="1999 VR232" bgcolor=#fefefe
| 0 ||  || MBA-I || 18.2 || data-sort-value="0.68" | 680 m || multiple || 1999–2020 || 12 Dec 2020 || 138 || align=left | Disc.: Spacewatch || 
|- id="1999 VS232" bgcolor=#E9E9E9
| 0 ||  || MBA-M || 17.69 || 1.2 km || multiple || 1999–2021 || 02 Dec 2021 || 99 || align=left | Disc.: Spacewatch || 
|- id="1999 VT232" bgcolor=#E9E9E9
| 1 ||  || MBA-M || 17.6 || 1.3 km || multiple || 1999–2020 || 05 Nov 2020 || 72 || align=left | Disc.: Spacewatch || 
|- id="1999 VV232" bgcolor=#E9E9E9
| 0 ||  || MBA-M || 17.93 || data-sort-value="0.77" | 770 m || multiple || 1999–2022 || 26 Jan 2022 || 87 || align=left | Disc.: Spacewatch || 
|- id="1999 VW232" bgcolor=#fefefe
| 0 ||  || MBA-I || 17.77 || data-sort-value="0.83" | 830 m || multiple || 1999–2021 || 30 Nov 2021 || 136 || align=left | Disc.: Spacewatch || 
|- id="1999 VX232" bgcolor=#E9E9E9
| 0 ||  || MBA-M || 18.04 || 1.4 km || multiple || 1999–2021 || 04 Oct 2021 || 75 || align=left | Disc.: Spacewatch || 
|- id="1999 VY232" bgcolor=#E9E9E9
| 0 ||  || MBA-M || 18.1 || 1.0 km || multiple || 1999–2020 || 15 Oct 2020 || 63 || align=left | Disc.: Spacewatch || 
|- id="1999 VZ232" bgcolor=#E9E9E9
| 0 ||  || MBA-M || 17.5 || 1.8 km || multiple || 1999–2020 || 21 Apr 2020 || 51 || align=left | Disc.: Spacewatch || 
|- id="1999 VA233" bgcolor=#E9E9E9
| 0 ||  = (619187) || MBA-M || 17.0 || 2.2 km || multiple || 1999–2020 || 19 May 2020 || 89 || align=left | Disc.: SpacewatchAlt.: 2010 JJ181 || 
|- id="1999 VB233" bgcolor=#fefefe
| 0 ||  || MBA-I || 18.72 || data-sort-value="0.54" | 540 m || multiple || 1999–2021 || 03 May 2021 || 80 || align=left | Disc.: Spacewatch || 
|- id="1999 VC233" bgcolor=#fefefe
| 0 ||  || MBA-I || 19.18 || data-sort-value="0.43" | 430 m || multiple || 1999–2021 || 14 Nov 2021 || 58 || align=left | Disc.: Spacewatch || 
|- id="1999 VD233" bgcolor=#fefefe
| 0 ||  || MBA-I || 18.5 || data-sort-value="0.59" | 590 m || multiple || 1999–2021 || 18 Jan 2021 || 66 || align=left | Disc.: Spacewatch || 
|- id="1999 VE233" bgcolor=#FA8072
| 0 ||  || MCA || 18.9 || data-sort-value="0.49" | 490 m || multiple || 1999–2019 || 26 Jul 2019 || 52 || align=left | Disc.: Spacewatch || 
|- id="1999 VF233" bgcolor=#E9E9E9
| 0 ||  || MBA-M || 17.66 || 1.6 km || multiple || 1999–2021 || 10 Nov 2021 || 53 || align=left | Disc.: Spacewatch || 
|- id="1999 VG233" bgcolor=#E9E9E9
| 0 ||  || MBA-M || 17.09 || 2.1 km || multiple || 1999–2021 || 09 Jun 2021 || 95 || align=left | Disc.: Spacewatch || 
|- id="1999 VH233" bgcolor=#fefefe
| 0 ||  || MBA-I || 17.76 || data-sort-value="0.83" | 830 m || multiple || 1999–2021 || 09 May 2021 || 88 || align=left | Disc.: Spacewatch || 
|- id="1999 VK233" bgcolor=#fefefe
| 0 ||  || MBA-I || 18.67 || data-sort-value="0.55" | 550 m || multiple || 1999–2021 || 12 Sep 2021 || 112 || align=left | Disc.: Spacewatch || 
|- id="1999 VL233" bgcolor=#fefefe
| 0 ||  = (619188) || MBA-I || 18.2 || data-sort-value="0.68" | 680 m || multiple || 1995–2020 || 16 Mar 2020 || 62 || align=left | Disc.: Spacewatch || 
|- id="1999 VM233" bgcolor=#d6d6d6
| 0 ||  || MBA-O || 16.81 || 2.4 km || multiple || 1999–2021 || 30 Nov 2021 || 105 || align=left | Disc.: Spacewatch || 
|- id="1999 VN233" bgcolor=#d6d6d6
| 0 ||  || MBA-O || 16.27 || 3.1 km || multiple || 1999–2022 || 17 Jan 2022 || 77 || align=left | Disc.: Spacewatch || 
|- id="1999 VO233" bgcolor=#E9E9E9
| 0 ||  = (619189) || MBA-M || 17.3 || 1.9 km || multiple || 1999–2020 || 27 Apr 2020 || 55 || align=left | Disc.: Spacewatch || 
|- id="1999 VQ233" bgcolor=#fefefe
| 0 ||  || MBA-I || 18.3 || data-sort-value="0.65" | 650 m || multiple || 1999–2018 || 05 Oct 2018 || 39 || align=left | Disc.: Spacewatch || 
|- id="1999 VR233" bgcolor=#fefefe
| 0 ||  || HUN || 19.17 || data-sort-value="0.44" | 440 m || multiple || 1999–2021 || 13 Oct 2021 || 45 || align=left | Disc.: Spacewatch || 
|- id="1999 VS233" bgcolor=#d6d6d6
| 0 ||  || MBA-O || 17.5 || 1.8 km || multiple || 1999–2018 || 07 Nov 2018 || 35 || align=left | Disc.: Spacewatch || 
|- id="1999 VT233" bgcolor=#d6d6d6
| 0 ||  || MBA-O || 16.70 || 2.5 km || multiple || 1999–2021 || 29 Nov 2021 || 157 || align=left | Disc.: Spacewatch || 
|- id="1999 VU233" bgcolor=#d6d6d6
| 0 ||  || MBA-O || 17.07 || 2.1 km || multiple || 1999–2022 || 09 Jan 2022 || 127 || align=left | Disc.: SpacewatchAlt.: 2017 FK199 || 
|- id="1999 VV233" bgcolor=#d6d6d6
| 0 ||  || MBA-O || 17.01 || 2.2 km || multiple || 1999–2021 || 27 Oct 2021 || 82 || align=left | Disc.: Spacewatch || 
|- id="1999 VW233" bgcolor=#fefefe
| 0 ||  || MBA-I || 19.04 || data-sort-value="0.46" | 460 m || multiple || 1999–2021 || 13 Sep 2021 || 51 || align=left | Disc.: Spacewatch || 
|- id="1999 VX233" bgcolor=#E9E9E9
| 0 ||  || MBA-M || 18.6 || data-sort-value="0.57" | 570 m || multiple || 1999–2021 || 18 Jan 2021 || 41 || align=left | Disc.: Spacewatch || 
|- id="1999 VY233" bgcolor=#E9E9E9
| 0 ||  || MBA-M || 17.92 || 1.5 km || multiple || 1999–2021 || 28 Oct 2021 || 85 || align=left | Disc.: Spacewatch || 
|- id="1999 VZ233" bgcolor=#E9E9E9
| 0 ||  || MBA-M || 17.74 || 1.6 km || multiple || 1999–2021 || 07 Sep 2021 || 85 || align=left | Disc.: Spacewatch || 
|- id="1999 VB234" bgcolor=#E9E9E9
| 1 ||  || MBA-M || 17.5 || data-sort-value="0.94" | 940 m || multiple || 1999–2021 || 15 Jan 2021 || 118 || align=left | Disc.: Kitt Peak || 
|- id="1999 VC234" bgcolor=#d6d6d6
| 2 ||  || MBA-O || 17.5 || 1.8 km || multiple || 1999–2019 || 01 Oct 2019 || 33 || align=left | Disc.: Spacewatch || 
|- id="1999 VD234" bgcolor=#d6d6d6
| 0 ||  || MBA-O || 17.6 || 1.7 km || multiple || 1999–2020 || 31 Jan 2020 || 35 || align=left | Disc.: SpacewatchAdded on 22 July 2020 || 
|- id="1999 VF234" bgcolor=#fefefe
| 2 ||  || MBA-I || 18.7 || data-sort-value="0.54" | 540 m || multiple || 1999–2021 || 06 Jan 2021 || 96 || align=left | Disc.: SpacewatchAdded on 17 January 2021 || 
|- id="1999 VG234" bgcolor=#d6d6d6
| 2 ||  || MBA-O || 17.9 || 1.5 km || multiple || 1999–2020 || 17 Nov 2020 || 29 || align=left | Disc.: SpacewatchAdded on 17 January 2021 || 
|- id="1999 VH234" bgcolor=#E9E9E9
| 2 ||  || MBA-M || 18.7 || data-sort-value="0.76" | 760 m || multiple || 1999–2020 || 07 Dec 2020 || 33 || align=left | Disc.: SpacewatchAdded on 17 January 2021 || 
|- id="1999 VJ234" bgcolor=#d6d6d6
| 2 ||  || MBA-O || 17.5 || 1.8 km || multiple || 1999–2021 || 10 Feb 2021 || 26 || align=left | Disc.: SpacewatchAdded on 11 May 2021 || 
|- id="1999 VL234" bgcolor=#FA8072
| 1 ||  || MCA || 19.61 || data-sort-value="0.36" | 360 m || multiple || 1999–2022 || 27 Jan 2022 || 19 || align=left | Disc.: SpacewatchAdded on 24 December 2021 || 
|}
back to top

W 

|- id="1999 WG5" bgcolor=#d6d6d6
| 0 ||  || MBA-O || 16.46 || 2.8 km || multiple || 1999–2021 || 27 Oct 2021 || 98 || align=left | Disc.: Spacewatch || 
|- id="1999 WX10" bgcolor=#d6d6d6
| 0 ||  || MBA-O || 17.72 || 1.6 km || multiple || 1999–2021 || 26 Nov 2021 || 45 || align=left | Disc.: Spacewatch || 
|- id="1999 WR11" bgcolor=#E9E9E9
| 1 ||  || MBA-M || 17.1 || 1.1 km || multiple || 1999–2021 || 03 Jan 2021 || 58 || align=left | Disc.: Spacewatch || 
|- id="1999 WU15" bgcolor=#E9E9E9
| 0 ||  || MBA-M || 17.43 || 1.4 km || multiple || 1999–2022 || 25 Jan 2022 || 130 || align=left | Disc.: SpacewatchAlt.: 2016 WM39 || 
|- id="1999 WP18" bgcolor=#E9E9E9
| 0 ||  || MBA-M || 17.7 || data-sort-value="0.86" | 860 m || multiple || 1999–2021 || 16 Jan 2021 || 90 || align=left | Disc.: Spacewatch || 
|- id="1999 WM19" bgcolor=#E9E9E9
| – ||  || MBA-M || 18.6 || data-sort-value="0.57" | 570 m || single || 13 days || 13 Dec 1999 || 9 || align=left | Disc.: Spacewatch || 
|- id="1999 WW20" bgcolor=#d6d6d6
| 0 ||  || MBA-O || 16.5 || 2.8 km || multiple || 1999–2020 || 08 Nov 2020 || 126 || align=left | Disc.: Spacewatch || 
|- id="1999 WA21" bgcolor=#fefefe
| 3 ||  || MBA-I || 18.6 || data-sort-value="0.57" | 570 m || multiple || 1999–2014 || 28 Nov 2014 || 42 || align=left | Disc.: SpacewatchAlt.: 2014 TM28 || 
|- id="1999 WK21" bgcolor=#d6d6d6
| 0 ||  || MBA-O || 17.64 || 1.7 km || multiple || 1999–2021 || 08 May 2021 || 69 || align=left | Disc.: SpacewatchAlt.: 2016 FO24 || 
|- id="1999 WX21" bgcolor=#fefefe
| 0 ||  || MBA-I || 18.5 || data-sort-value="0.59" | 590 m || multiple || 1999–2018 || 06 Oct 2018 || 50 || align=left | Disc.: Spacewatch || 
|- id="1999 WY21" bgcolor=#E9E9E9
| 0 ||  || MBA-M || 17.97 || 1.4 km || multiple || 1999–2021 || 10 Sep 2021 || 38 || align=left | Disc.: Spacewatch || 
|- id="1999 WA22" bgcolor=#E9E9E9
| 1 ||  || MBA-M || 17.7 || 1.2 km || multiple || 1999–2021 || 15 Jan 2021 || 63 || align=left | Disc.: SpacewatchAdded on 9 March 2021Alt.: 2020 TP9 || 
|- id="1999 WB22" bgcolor=#E9E9E9
| 0 ||  || MBA-M || 16.9 || 2.3 km || multiple || 1999–2020 || 24 Mar 2020 || 73 || align=left | Disc.: Spacewatch || 
|- id="1999 WD22" bgcolor=#d6d6d6
| 0 ||  || MBA-O || 17.0 || 2.2 km || multiple || 1996–2021 || 11 Jun 2021 || 159 || align=left | Disc.: SpacewatchAlt.: 2011 GV104, 2016 GU230, 2018 VK22 || 
|- id="1999 WJ22" bgcolor=#fefefe
| 0 ||  || MBA-I || 18.44 || data-sort-value="0.61" | 610 m || multiple || 1999–2021 || 06 Nov 2021 || 99 || align=left | Disc.: Spacewatch || 
|- id="1999 WU22" bgcolor=#fefefe
| 0 ||  || MBA-I || 18.93 || data-sort-value="0.49" | 490 m || multiple || 1999–2021 || 07 Nov 2021 || 54 || align=left | Disc.: Spacewatch || 
|- id="1999 WD23" bgcolor=#E9E9E9
| 3 ||  || MBA-M || 19.9 || data-sort-value="0.44" | 440 m || multiple || 1999–2020 || 05 Nov 2020 || 24 || align=left | Disc.: SpacewatchAdded on 17 June 2021Alt.: 2020 UT40 || 
|- id="1999 WX23" bgcolor=#E9E9E9
| 0 ||  || MBA-M || 16.9 || 1.2 km || multiple || 1999–2021 || 17 Jan 2021 || 147 || align=left | Disc.: SpacewatchAlt.: 2002 ND64, 2003 UF360, 2007 TS176, 2011 SD125 || 
|- id="1999 WG24" bgcolor=#fefefe
| 0 ||  || MBA-I || 18.77 || data-sort-value="0.52" | 520 m || multiple || 1999–2021 || 10 May 2021 || 74 || align=left | Disc.: SpacewatchAlt.: 2009 UW64 || 
|- id="1999 WH24" bgcolor=#d6d6d6
| 0 ||  || MBA-O || 16.6 || 2.7 km || multiple || 1999–2020 || 26 Sep 2020 || 66 || align=left | Disc.: Spacewatch || 
|- id="1999 WT24" bgcolor=#E9E9E9
| 0 ||  || MBA-M || 17.65 || data-sort-value="0.88" | 880 m || multiple || 1999–2021 || 14 Apr 2021 || 123 || align=left | Disc.: SpacewatchAlt.: 2013 CA148 || 
|- id="1999 WY24" bgcolor=#fefefe
| 0 ||  || HUN || 19.1 || data-sort-value="0.45" | 450 m || multiple || 1999–2021 || 12 Feb 2021 || 62 || align=left | Disc.: SpacewatchAlt.: 2019 JC6 || 
|- id="1999 WK25" bgcolor=#d6d6d6
| 0 ||  || MBA-O || 17.2 || 2.0 km || multiple || 1999–2019 || 01 Nov 2019 || 62 || align=left | Disc.: SpacewatchAlt.: 2004 VV104 || 
|- id="1999 WL25" bgcolor=#d6d6d6
| 1 ||  || MBA-O || 18.73 || 1.0 km || multiple || 1999–2021 || 15 Apr 2021 || 26 || align=left | Disc.: SpacewatchAdded on 17 June 2021Alt.: 2019 UT58 || 
|- id="1999 WO25" bgcolor=#E9E9E9
| 0 ||  || MBA-M || 17.6 || data-sort-value="0.90" | 900 m || multiple || 1999–2020 || 16 Dec 2020 || 55 || align=left | Disc.: SpacewatchAlt.: 2011 PP3 || 
|- id="1999 WZ27" bgcolor=#fefefe
| 0 ||  = (619190) || MBA-I || 18.1 || data-sort-value="0.71" | 710 m || multiple || 1999–2020 || 22 Mar 2020 || 84 || align=left | Disc.: Spacewatch || 
|- id="1999 WA28" bgcolor=#fefefe
| 0 ||  || MBA-I || 18.10 || data-sort-value="0.71" | 710 m || multiple || 1999–2021 || 14 May 2021 || 112 || align=left | Disc.: Spacewatch || 
|- id="1999 WB28" bgcolor=#E9E9E9
| 0 ||  || MBA-M || 17.11 || 2.1 km || multiple || 1999–2021 || 14 Aug 2021 || 120 || align=left | Disc.: Spacewatch || 
|- id="1999 WD28" bgcolor=#E9E9E9
| 0 ||  || MBA-M || 17.0 || 2.2 km || multiple || 1999–2020 || 02 Apr 2020 || 82 || align=left | Disc.: Spacewatch || 
|- id="1999 WE28" bgcolor=#fefefe
| 0 ||  || MBA-I || 18.82 || data-sort-value="0.51" | 510 m || multiple || 1999–2021 || 08 Aug 2021 || 85 || align=left | Disc.: Spacewatch || 
|- id="1999 WF28" bgcolor=#d6d6d6
| 0 ||  || MBA-O || 17.05 || 2.2 km || multiple || 1999–2021 || 13 May 2021 || 106 || align=left | Disc.: Spacewatch || 
|- id="1999 WG28" bgcolor=#fefefe
| 0 ||  || MBA-I || 18.39 || data-sort-value="0.62" | 620 m || multiple || 1999–2021 || 17 Apr 2021 || 81 || align=left | Disc.: Spacewatch || 
|- id="1999 WH28" bgcolor=#E9E9E9
| 0 ||  || MBA-M || 17.76 || 1.6 km || multiple || 1999–2021 || 29 Sep 2021 || 65 || align=left | Disc.: Spacewatch || 
|- id="1999 WJ28" bgcolor=#d6d6d6
| 0 ||  || MBA-O || 17.4 || 1.8 km || multiple || 1999–2021 || 14 Jan 2021 || 60 || align=left | Disc.: Spacewatch || 
|- id="1999 WK28" bgcolor=#fefefe
| 0 ||  || MBA-I || 18.08 || data-sort-value="0.72" | 720 m || multiple || 1999–2021 || 31 Aug 2021 || 103 || align=left | Disc.: Spacewatch || 
|- id="1999 WL28" bgcolor=#E9E9E9
| 0 ||  || MBA-M || 17.7 || data-sort-value="0.86" | 860 m || multiple || 1999–2019 || 29 Oct 2019 || 64 || align=left | Disc.: Spacewatch || 
|- id="1999 WM28" bgcolor=#fefefe
| 0 ||  || MBA-I || 18.3 || data-sort-value="0.65" | 650 m || multiple || 1999–2020 || 09 Sep 2020 || 80 || align=left | Disc.: Spacewatch || 
|- id="1999 WN28" bgcolor=#d6d6d6
| 0 ||  || MBA-O || 17.44 || 1.8 km || multiple || 1999–2021 || 11 May 2021 || 72 || align=left | Disc.: Spacewatch || 
|- id="1999 WO28" bgcolor=#fefefe
| 0 ||  || MBA-I || 18.8 || data-sort-value="0.52" | 520 m || multiple || 1999–2020 || 07 Dec 2020 || 69 || align=left | Disc.: Spacewatch || 
|- id="1999 WP28" bgcolor=#fefefe
| 0 ||  || MBA-I || 18.36 || data-sort-value="0.63" | 630 m || multiple || 1999–2022 || 24 Jan 2022 || 68 || align=left | Disc.: Spacewatch || 
|- id="1999 WQ28" bgcolor=#fefefe
| 0 ||  || MBA-I || 18.2 || data-sort-value="0.68" | 680 m || multiple || 1999–2020 || 17 Nov 2020 || 62 || align=left | Disc.: Spacewatch || 
|- id="1999 WR28" bgcolor=#fefefe
| 0 ||  || MBA-I || 18.7 || data-sort-value="0.54" | 540 m || multiple || 1999–2020 || 23 Jun 2020 || 48 || align=left | Disc.: Spacewatch || 
|- id="1999 WS28" bgcolor=#E9E9E9
| 0 ||  || MBA-M || 17.3 || 1.5 km || multiple || 1999–2020 || 04 Nov 2020 || 40 || align=left | Disc.: Spacewatch || 
|- id="1999 WT28" bgcolor=#fefefe
| 1 ||  || MBA-I || 19.3 || data-sort-value="0.41" | 410 m || multiple || 1999–2019 || 15 Nov 2019 || 66 || align=left | Disc.: Spacewatch || 
|- id="1999 WU28" bgcolor=#fefefe
| 0 ||  || MBA-I || 18.4 || data-sort-value="0.62" | 620 m || multiple || 1999–2019 || 23 Oct 2019 || 51 || align=left | Disc.: Spacewatch || 
|- id="1999 WV28" bgcolor=#E9E9E9
| 0 ||  = (619191) || MBA-M || 17.3 || 1.9 km || multiple || 1999–2020 || 27 Apr 2020 || 68 || align=left | Disc.: Spacewatch || 
|- id="1999 WW28" bgcolor=#fefefe
| 0 ||  || MBA-I || 18.39 || data-sort-value="0.62" | 620 m || multiple || 1999–2021 || 09 Jul 2021 || 67 || align=left | Disc.: Spacewatch || 
|- id="1999 WX28" bgcolor=#fefefe
| 0 ||  || MBA-I || 18.84 || data-sort-value="0.51" | 510 m || multiple || 1999–2021 || 06 Nov 2021 || 107 || align=left | Disc.: Spacewatch || 
|- id="1999 WY28" bgcolor=#d6d6d6
| 0 ||  || MBA-O || 16.74 || 2.5 km || multiple || 1999–2019 || 07 Jun 2019 || 38 || align=left | Disc.: Spacewatch || 
|- id="1999 WZ28" bgcolor=#d6d6d6
| 0 ||  || MBA-O || 16.9 || 2.3 km || multiple || 1999–2020 || 08 Dec 2020 || 64 || align=left | Disc.: Spacewatch || 
|- id="1999 WA29" bgcolor=#fefefe
| 0 ||  || MBA-I || 18.89 || data-sort-value="0.50" | 500 m || multiple || 1999–2021 || 09 Dec 2021 || 70 || align=left | Disc.: Spacewatch || 
|- id="1999 WB29" bgcolor=#E9E9E9
| 0 ||  || MBA-M || 17.9 || 1.1 km || multiple || 1999–2020 || 23 Aug 2020 || 69 || align=left | Disc.: Spacewatch || 
|- id="1999 WD29" bgcolor=#fefefe
| 0 ||  || MBA-I || 18.6 || data-sort-value="0.57" | 570 m || multiple || 1999–2020 || 27 Apr 2020 || 41 || align=left | Disc.: Spacewatch || 
|- id="1999 WF29" bgcolor=#fefefe
| 0 ||  || MBA-I || 18.7 || data-sort-value="0.54" | 540 m || multiple || 1999–2021 || 18 Jan 2021 || 50 || align=left | Disc.: SpacewatchAdded on 9 March 2021 || 
|}
back to top

X 

|- id="1999 XN2" bgcolor=#fefefe
| 0 ||  || HUN || 18.20 || data-sort-value="0.68" | 680 m || multiple || 1999–2021 || 03 Dec 2021 || 139 || align=left | Disc.: SpacewatchAlt.: 2014 AT53, 2017 CJ32, 2018 PD18 || 
|- id="1999 XJ9" bgcolor=#E9E9E9
| 0 ||  || MBA-M || 17.7 || data-sort-value="0.86" | 860 m || multiple || 1999–2021 || 14 Jan 2021 || 51 || align=left | Disc.: Spacewatch || 
|- id="1999 XM16" bgcolor=#fefefe
| 0 ||  || MBA-I || 17.38 || data-sort-value="0.99" | 990 m || multiple || 1999–2021 || 14 Apr 2021 || 165 || align=left | Disc.: LINEARAlt.: 2010 BA14 || 
|- id="1999 XS35" bgcolor=#C7FF8F
| 2 ||  || CEN || 17.2 || 2.2 km || single || 88 days || 28 Feb 2000 || 206 || align=left | Disc.: LONEOSPotentially hazardous objectNEO larger than 1 kilometerAPO at MPC || 
|- id="1999 XX67" bgcolor=#d6d6d6
| 0 ||  || MBA-O || 15.97 || 3.6 km || multiple || 1999–2021 || 09 May 2021 || 80 || align=left | Disc.: LINEAR || 
|- id="1999 XD106" bgcolor=#FA8072
| 0 ||  || MCA || 17.0 || 1.7 km || multiple || 1999–2021 || 07 Jan 2021 || 213 || align=left | Disc.: LINEAR || 
|- id="1999 XF106" bgcolor=#E9E9E9
| 0 ||  || MBA-M || 17.24 || 1.5 km || multiple || 1999–2022 || 27 Jan 2022 || 87 || align=left | Disc.: Prescott Obs. || 
|- id="1999 XE124" bgcolor=#fefefe
| 0 ||  || MBA-I || 18.25 || data-sort-value="0.67" | 670 m || multiple || 1999–2021 || 03 May 2021 || 112 || align=left | Disc.: CSSAlt.: 2002 PK203, 2012 PB17, 2017 DW29 || 
|- id="1999 XO135" bgcolor=#FA8072
| 0 ||  || MCA || 16.80 || 2.4 km || multiple || 1999–2022 || 15 Jan 2022 || 172 || align=left | Disc.: LINEAR || 
|- id="1999 XK136" bgcolor=#FFC2E0
| 0 ||  || APO || 20.55 || data-sort-value="0.811" | 811 m || multiple || 1999–2022 || 06 Jan 2022 || 139 || align=left | Disc.: LINEARPotentially hazardous object || 
|- id="1999 XK141" bgcolor=#FA8072
| 1 ||  || MCA || 17.7 || data-sort-value="0.86" | 860 m || multiple || 1995–2020 || 24 Jan 2020 || 114 || align=left | Disc.: LINEAR || 
|- id="1999 XN141" bgcolor=#FFC2E0
| 5 ||  || APO || 22.6 || data-sort-value="0.11" | 110 m || single || 16 days || 30 Dec 1999 || 18 || align=left | Disc.: LINEAR || 
|- id="1999 XY143" bgcolor=#C2E0FF
| 2 ||  || TNO || 6.2 || 226 km || multiple || 1999–2020 || 18 Jan 2020 || 44 || align=left | Disc.: Whipple Obs.LoUTNOs, cubewano (hot), binary: 190 km || 
|- id="1999 XX146" bgcolor=#d6d6d6
| 0 ||  || MBA-O || 17.43 || 1.8 km || multiple || 1999–2021 || 27 Nov 2021 || 64 || align=left | Disc.: SpacewatchAdded on 5 November 2021 || 
|- id="1999 XM147" bgcolor=#E9E9E9
| 0 ||  || MBA-M || 17.0 || 1.7 km || multiple || 1999–2022 || 10 Jan 2022 || 108 || align=left | Disc.: SpacewatchAlt.: 2009 CY12, 2015 PU219 || 
|- id="1999 XT147" bgcolor=#d6d6d6
| 0 ||  || MBA-O || 17.1 || 2.1 km || multiple || 1999–2020 || 08 Oct 2020 || 55 || align=left | Disc.: SpacewatchAdded on 17 January 2021 || 
|- id="1999 XA148" bgcolor=#d6d6d6
| 0 ||  || MBA-O || 17.17 || 2.0 km || multiple || 1999–2022 || 06 Jan 2022 || 63 || align=left | Disc.: SpacewatchAdded on 17 January 2021 || 
|- id="1999 XJ148" bgcolor=#fefefe
| 0 ||  || MBA-I || 19.15 || data-sort-value="0.44" | 440 m || multiple || 1999–2021 || 30 Nov 2021 || 83 || align=left | Disc.: Spacewatch || 
|- id="1999 XR148" bgcolor=#d6d6d6
| 0 ||  || MBA-O || 16.65 || 2.6 km || multiple || 1999–2021 || 09 Jul 2021 || 195 || align=left | Disc.: SpacewatchAlt.: 2006 DB184, 2015 AV173, 2017 NX || 
|- id="1999 XX148" bgcolor=#fefefe
| 2 ||  || HUN || 18.9 || data-sort-value="0.49" | 490 m || multiple || 1999–2019 || 02 Nov 2019 || 32 || align=left | Disc.: Spacewatch || 
|- id="1999 XN149" bgcolor=#E9E9E9
| 0 ||  || MBA-M || 17.12 || 1.6 km || multiple || 1999–2022 || 17 Jan 2022 || 206 || align=left | Disc.: Spacewatch || 
|- id="1999 XS149" bgcolor=#E9E9E9
| 1 ||  || MBA-M || 17.8 || data-sort-value="0.82" | 820 m || multiple || 1999–2019 || 31 Oct 2019 || 39 || align=left | Disc.: Spacewatch || 
|- id="1999 XW149" bgcolor=#d6d6d6
| 0 ||  || MBA-O || 17.0 || 2.2 km || multiple || 1999–2021 || 16 Jan 2021 || 123 || align=left | Disc.: SpacewatchAlt.: 2014 SF65 || 
|- id="1999 XD150" bgcolor=#d6d6d6
| 0 ||  || MBA-O || 16.64 || 2.6 km || multiple || 1999–2021 || 18 May 2021 || 123 || align=left | Disc.: SpacewatchAdded on 22 July 2020 || 
|- id="1999 XE150" bgcolor=#E9E9E9
| 0 ||  || MBA-M || 18.25 || data-sort-value="0.67" | 670 m || multiple || 1999–2021 || 14 Apr 2021 || 59 || align=left | Disc.: SpacewatchAdded on 24 August 2020Alt.: 2011 VN7, 2019 UX32 || 
|- id="1999 XF150" bgcolor=#E9E9E9
| 0 ||  || MBA-M || 17.40 || 1.8 km || multiple || 1999–2021 || 08 Aug 2021 || 98 || align=left | Disc.: SpacewatchAdded on 22 July 2020 || 
|- id="1999 XO150" bgcolor=#d6d6d6
| 0 ||  || MBA-O || 16.5 || 2.8 km || multiple || 1999–2021 || 05 Jan 2021 || 106 || align=left | Disc.: SpacewatchAlt.: 2014 UU221, 2016 AL94 || 
|- id="1999 XP150" bgcolor=#fefefe
| 0 ||  || MBA-I || 18.4 || data-sort-value="0.62" | 620 m || multiple || 1999–2021 || 18 Jan 2021 || 92 || align=left | Disc.: Spacewatch || 
|- id="1999 XV150" bgcolor=#fefefe
| 0 ||  || MBA-I || 18.1 || data-sort-value="0.71" | 710 m || multiple || 1999–2021 || 18 Jan 2021 || 93 || align=left | Disc.: SpacewatchAlt.: 2009 TF33 || 
|- id="1999 XB152" bgcolor=#d6d6d6
| 0 ||  || MBA-O || 16.43 || 2.9 km || multiple || 1999–2021 || 08 Jul 2021 || 56 || align=left | Disc.: Spacewatch || 
|- id="1999 XA216" bgcolor=#fefefe
| 0 ||  || MBA-I || 18.5 || data-sort-value="0.59" | 590 m || multiple || 1999–2019 || 26 Sep 2019 || 60 || align=left | Disc.: SpacewatchAlt.: 2002 TG386, 2016 WG22 || 
|- id="1999 XL224" bgcolor=#E9E9E9
| 0 ||  || MBA-M || 17.29 || 1.9 km || multiple || 1999–2021 || 11 Oct 2021 || 105 || align=left | Disc.: SpacewatchAlt.: 2010 FP5 || 
|- id="1999 XE228" bgcolor=#d6d6d6
| 0 ||  || MBA-O || 16.7 || 2.5 km || multiple || 1999–2021 || 10 Jan 2021 || 120 || align=left | Disc.: SpacewatchAlt.: 2015 XW382 || 
|- id="1999 XK232" bgcolor=#E9E9E9
| 0 ||  || MBA-M || 17.8 || data-sort-value="0.82" | 820 m || multiple || 1999–2019 || 29 Sep 2019 || 46 || align=left | Disc.: SpacewatchAdded on 30 September 2021Alt.: 2003 UK436 || 
|- id="1999 XW232" bgcolor=#E9E9E9
| 1 ||  || MBA-M || 17.4 || data-sort-value="0.98" | 980 m || multiple || 1999–2021 || 07 Feb 2021 || 65 || align=left | Disc.: LINEARAdded on 11 May 2021Alt.: 2015 PX56 || 
|- id="1999 XV240" bgcolor=#E9E9E9
| 1 ||  || MBA-M || 16.8 || 1.3 km || multiple || 1999–2021 || 11 Apr 2021 || 118 || align=left | Disc.: CSSAdded on 9 March 2021Alt.: 2020 UK4 || 
|- id="1999 XH244" bgcolor=#fefefe
| 0 ||  || MBA-I || 17.9 || data-sort-value="0.78" | 780 m || multiple || 1999–2020 || 22 Mar 2020 || 48 || align=left | Disc.: SpacewatchAdded on 22 July 2020 || 
|- id="1999 XT244" bgcolor=#fefefe
| 0 ||  || MBA-I || 17.3 || 1.0 km || multiple || 1999–2020 || 24 Mar 2020 || 100 || align=left | Disc.: SpacewatchAlt.: 2005 GJ206, 2014 SO183 || 
|- id="1999 XK251" bgcolor=#d6d6d6
| 1 ||  || MBA-O || 17.65 || 1.6 km || multiple || 1999–2021 || 06 Jul 2021 || 39 || align=left | Disc.: SpacewatchAlt.: 2016 XF10 || 
|- id="1999 XK253" bgcolor=#d6d6d6
| 0 ||  || MBA-O || 16.9 || 2.3 km || multiple || 1999–2021 || 17 Jan 2021 || 72 || align=left | Disc.: Spacewatch || 
|- id="1999 XT253" bgcolor=#E9E9E9
| 0 ||  || MBA-M || 18.24 || 1.3 km || multiple || 1999–2021 || 06 Nov 2021 || 71 || align=left | Disc.: SpacewatchAdded on 5 November 2021 || 
|- id="1999 XC254" bgcolor=#E9E9E9
| 0 ||  || MBA-M || 17.99 || data-sort-value="0.75" | 750 m || multiple || 1999–2021 || 08 May 2021 || 85 || align=left | Disc.: SpacewatchAlt.: 2015 XL205 || 
|- id="1999 XF254" bgcolor=#fefefe
| 0 ||  || MBA-I || 19.1 || data-sort-value="0.45" | 450 m || multiple || 1999–2020 || 18 Aug 2020 || 37 || align=left | Disc.: Spacewatch || 
|- id="1999 XS254" bgcolor=#fefefe
| 0 ||  || MBA-I || 17.94 || data-sort-value="0.77" | 770 m || multiple || 1999–2021 || 03 May 2021 || 86 || align=left | Disc.: Spacewatch || 
|- id="1999 XZ254" bgcolor=#E9E9E9
| 0 ||  || MBA-M || 17.42 || 1.8 km || multiple || 1999–2021 || 12 Aug 2021 || 71 || align=left | Disc.: Spacewatch || 
|- id="1999 XA255" bgcolor=#E9E9E9
| 0 ||  || MBA-M || 17.34 || 1.0 km || multiple || 1999–2021 || 16 May 2021 || 42 || align=left | Disc.: Spacewatch || 
|- id="1999 XD255" bgcolor=#E9E9E9
| 0 ||  || MBA-M || 16.6 || 1.4 km || multiple || 1999–2020 || 24 Jan 2020 || 83 || align=left | Disc.: SpacewatchAlt.: 2014 MD69 || 
|- id="1999 XY255" bgcolor=#d6d6d6
| 0 ||  || MBA-O || 16.61 || 2.7 km || multiple || 1999–2021 || 03 Apr 2021 || 163 || align=left | Disc.: SpacewatchAlt.: 2004 XY47, 2014 WW435 || 
|- id="1999 XW258" bgcolor=#E9E9E9
| 0 ||  || MBA-M || 17.7 || data-sort-value="0.86" | 860 m || multiple || 1999–2021 || 16 Jan 2021 || 70 || align=left | Disc.: SpacewatchAdded on 17 January 2021 || 
|- id="1999 XV264" bgcolor=#fefefe
| 0 ||  || MBA-I || 18.9 || data-sort-value="0.49" | 490 m || multiple || 1999–2019 || 19 Nov 2019 || 39 || align=left | Disc.: Spacewatch || 
|- id="1999 XS265" bgcolor=#fefefe
| 0 ||  || MBA-I || 17.8 || data-sort-value="0.82" | 820 m || multiple || 1999–2020 || 10 Dec 2020 || 135 || align=left | Disc.: Spacewatch || 
|- id="1999 XT265" bgcolor=#d6d6d6
| 0 ||  || MBA-O || 16.84 || 2.4 km || multiple || 1999–2021 || 11 May 2021 || 109 || align=left | Disc.: Spacewatch || 
|- id="1999 XV265" bgcolor=#fefefe
| 0 ||  || MBA-I || 17.74 || data-sort-value="0.84" | 840 m || multiple || 1999–2021 || 12 May 2021 || 152 || align=left | Disc.: Spacewatch || 
|- id="1999 XW265" bgcolor=#d6d6d6
| 0 ||  || MBA-O || 17.10 || 2.1 km || multiple || 1999–2021 || 30 Jun 2021 || 83 || align=left | Disc.: Spacewatch || 
|- id="1999 XX265" bgcolor=#fefefe
| 0 ||  || MBA-I || 18.21 || data-sort-value="0.68" | 680 m || multiple || 1999–2022 || 04 Jan 2022 || 93 || align=left | Disc.: Spacewatch || 
|- id="1999 XY265" bgcolor=#fefefe
| 0 ||  || MBA-I || 17.91 || data-sort-value="0.78" | 780 m || multiple || 1999–2021 || 30 Jul 2021 || 96 || align=left | Disc.: Spacewatch || 
|- id="1999 XZ265" bgcolor=#fefefe
| 0 ||  || MBA-I || 18.56 || data-sort-value="0.58" | 580 m || multiple || 1995–2021 || 09 Dec 2021 || 115 || align=left | Disc.: SpacewatchAlt.: 1995 SN81 || 
|- id="1999 XA266" bgcolor=#fefefe
| 0 ||  || MBA-I || 17.9 || data-sort-value="0.78" | 780 m || multiple || 1999–2021 || 18 Jan 2021 || 96 || align=left | Disc.: Spacewatch || 
|- id="1999 XC266" bgcolor=#fefefe
| 1 ||  || HUN || 18.9 || data-sort-value="0.49" | 490 m || multiple || 1999–2018 || 20 Jan 2018 || 39 || align=left | Disc.: Spacewatch || 
|- id="1999 XD266" bgcolor=#fefefe
| 1 ||  || MBA-I || 18.9 || data-sort-value="0.49" | 490 m || multiple || 1999–2020 || 24 Jan 2020 || 42 || align=left | Disc.: Spacewatch || 
|- id="1999 XF266" bgcolor=#fefefe
| 1 ||  || MBA-I || 19.3 || data-sort-value="0.41" | 410 m || multiple || 1999–2020 || 11 Aug 2020 || 31 || align=left | Disc.: Spacewatch || 
|- id="1999 XG266" bgcolor=#d6d6d6
| 0 ||  || MBA-O || 16.49 || 2.8 km || multiple || 1999–2022 || 06 Jan 2022 || 158 || align=left | Disc.: Spacewatch || 
|- id="1999 XH266" bgcolor=#E9E9E9
| 0 ||  || MBA-M || 17.7 || data-sort-value="0.86" | 860 m || multiple || 1999–2021 || 18 Jan 2021 || 93 || align=left | Disc.: Spacewatch || 
|- id="1999 XJ266" bgcolor=#d6d6d6
| 0 ||  || MBA-O || 16.76 || 2.5 km || multiple || 1999–2021 || 08 Nov 2021 || 87 || align=left | Disc.: Spacewatch || 
|- id="1999 XK266" bgcolor=#d6d6d6
| 0 ||  || MBA-O || 16.6 || 2.7 km || multiple || 1999–2021 || 03 Jan 2021 || 71 || align=left | Disc.: Spacewatch || 
|- id="1999 XL266" bgcolor=#d6d6d6
| 0 ||  || MBA-O || 16.5 || 2.8 km || multiple || 1999–2019 || 24 Dec 2019 || 53 || align=left | Disc.: SpacewatchAlt.: 2010 BE135 || 
|- id="1999 XM266" bgcolor=#fefefe
| 0 ||  || MBA-I || 18.73 || data-sort-value="0.53" | 530 m || multiple || 1999–2021 || 30 Jun 2021 || 46 || align=left | Disc.: Kitt Peak || 
|- id="1999 XN266" bgcolor=#E9E9E9
| 0 ||  || MBA-M || 17.0 || 2.2 km || multiple || 1999–2020 || 25 May 2020 || 89 || align=left | Disc.: Spacewatch || 
|- id="1999 XO266" bgcolor=#C2FFFF
| 0 ||  || JT || 13.89 || 9.3 km || multiple || 1999–2021 || 27 Nov 2021 || 134 || align=left | Disc.: SpacewatchGreek camp (L4) || 
|- id="1999 XP266" bgcolor=#E9E9E9
| 0 ||  || MBA-M || 17.59 || 1.7 km || multiple || 1999–2021 || 31 Oct 2021 || 88 || align=left | Disc.: Spacewatch || 
|- id="1999 XQ266" bgcolor=#d6d6d6
| 0 ||  || MBA-O || 16.64 || 2.6 km || multiple || 1999–2021 || 27 Nov 2021 || 114 || align=left | Disc.: Spacewatch || 
|- id="1999 XR266" bgcolor=#d6d6d6
| 0 ||  || MBA-O || 16.46 || 2.8 km || multiple || 1999–2022 || 07 Jan 2022 || 145 || align=left | Disc.: Spacewatch || 
|- id="1999 XS266" bgcolor=#E9E9E9
| 0 ||  || MBA-M || 17.9 || data-sort-value="0.78" | 780 m || multiple || 1999–2019 || 05 Aug 2019 || 44 || align=left | Disc.: Spacewatch || 
|- id="1999 XT266" bgcolor=#d6d6d6
| 0 ||  || MBA-O || 16.47 || 2.8 km || multiple || 1999–2022 || 27 Jan 2022 || 67 || align=left | Disc.: Spacewatch || 
|- id="1999 XU266" bgcolor=#fefefe
| 0 ||  || MBA-I || 18.22 || data-sort-value="0.67" | 670 m || multiple || 1999–2021 || 03 Dec 2021 || 112 || align=left | Disc.: Spacewatch || 
|- id="1999 XV266" bgcolor=#fefefe
| 0 ||  || MBA-I || 18.58 || data-sort-value="0.57" | 570 m || multiple || 1999–2021 || 09 Sep 2021 || 51 || align=left | Disc.: Spacewatch || 
|- id="1999 XW266" bgcolor=#d6d6d6
| 0 ||  = (619192) || MBA-O || 17.2 || 2.0 km || multiple || 1999–2018 || 12 Feb 2018 || 55 || align=left | Disc.: Spacewatch || 
|- id="1999 XX266" bgcolor=#fefefe
| 1 ||  || MBA-I || 18.0 || data-sort-value="0.75" | 750 m || multiple || 1999–2020 || 14 Sep 2020 || 50 || align=left | Disc.: SpacewatchAdded on 13 September 2020 || 
|}
back to top

Y 

|- id="1999 YD" bgcolor=#FFC2E0
| 4 || 1999 YD || APO || 21.1 || data-sort-value="0.21" | 210 m || single || 71 days || 26 Feb 2000 || 99 || align=left | Disc.: LINEARPotentially hazardous objectAMO at MPC || 
|- id="1999 YA2" bgcolor=#d6d6d6
| 0 ||  = (619193) || MBA-O || 16.09 || 3.4 km || multiple || 1999–2021 || 14 Nov 2021 || 130 || align=left | Disc.: Spacewatch || 
|- id="1999 YD2" bgcolor=#fefefe
| 0 ||  || MBA-I || 18.17 || data-sort-value="0.69" | 690 m || multiple || 1995–2021 || 10 Dec 2021 || 106 || align=left | Disc.: SpacewatchAdded on 22 July 2020 || 
|- id="1999 YH2" bgcolor=#d6d6d6
| 0 ||  || MBA-O || 16.81 || 2.4 km || multiple || 1999-2022 || 29 Nov 2022 || 38 || align=left | Disc.: Spacewatch || 
|- id="1999 YM2" bgcolor=#E9E9E9
| 0 ||  || MBA-M || 17.24 || 2.0 km || multiple || 1999–2021 || 27 Nov 2021 || 93 || align=left | Disc.: Spacewatch || 
|- id="1999 YE3" bgcolor=#FA8072
| 0 ||  || MCA || 16.72 || 1.9 km || multiple || 1999–2021 || 03 Apr 2021 || 232 || align=left | Disc.: LINEAR || 
|- id="1999 YP7" bgcolor=#d6d6d6
| 0 ||  || MBA-O || 16.86 || 2.4 km || multiple || 1999–2021 || 09 Jan 2021 || 67 || align=left | Disc.: SpacewatchAdded on 11 May 2021 || 
|- id="1999 YS7" bgcolor=#d6d6d6
| 0 ||  || MBA-O || 16.70 || 2.5 km || multiple || 1999–2021 || 26 Nov 2021 || 71 || align=left | Disc.: SpacewatchAdded on 5 November 2021Alt.: 2015 OJ63 || 
|- id="1999 YD16" bgcolor=#E9E9E9
| 0 ||  || MBA-M || 16.9 || 1.2 km || multiple || 1999–2021 || 14 Jan 2021 || 70 || align=left | Disc.: Spacewatch || 
|- id="1999 YC17" bgcolor=#E9E9E9
| 0 ||  || MBA-M || 16.8 || 2.4 km || multiple || 1993–2020 || 20 Oct 2020 || 133 || align=left | Disc.: Spacewatch || 
|- id="1999 YN17" bgcolor=#d6d6d6
| 0 ||  || MBA-O || 16.01 || 3.5 km || multiple || 1999–2022 || 06 Jan 2022 || 68 || align=left | Disc.: Piszkéstető Stn. || 
|- id="1999 YE19" bgcolor=#d6d6d6
| 0 ||  || MBA-O || 17.3 || 1.9 km || multiple || 1999–2018 || 17 Aug 2018 || 36 || align=left | Disc.: Mauna Kea Obs.Added on 22 July 2020 || 
|- id="1999 YM19" bgcolor=#d6d6d6
| 0 ||  || MBA-O || 17.3 || 1.9 km || multiple || 1999–2020 || 26 Apr 2020 || 66 || align=left | Disc.: Mauna Kea Obs. || 
|- id="1999 YV19" bgcolor=#d6d6d6
| 0 ||  = (619194) || MBA-O || 16.6 || 2.7 km || multiple || 1999–2020 || 11 May 2020 || 64 || align=left | Disc.: Mauna Kea Obs.Added on 22 July 2020 || 
|- id="1999 YB20" bgcolor=#d6d6d6
| 0 ||  || MBA-O || 17.3 || 1.9 km || multiple || 1999–2019 || 30 Nov 2019 || 33 || align=left | Disc.: Mauna Kea Obs. || 
|- id="1999 YF20" bgcolor=#C2FFFF
| 0 ||  || JT || 14.74 || 6.3 km || multiple || 1999–2021 || 02 Dec 2021 || 66 || align=left | Disc.: Mauna Kea Obs.Added on 30 September 2021Greek camp (L4)Alt.: 2015 MT41 || 
|- id="1999 YJ20" bgcolor=#E9E9E9
| 0 ||  || MBA-M || 17.31 || 1.9 km || multiple || 1999–2021 || 27 Oct 2021 || 119 || align=left | Disc.: Mauna Kea Obs.Alt.: 2012 TC279 || 
|- id="1999 YP20" bgcolor=#d6d6d6
| 4 ||  || MBA-O || 17.6 || 1.7 km || multiple || 1999–2020 || 17 Nov 2020 || 16 || align=left | Disc.: Mauna Kea Obs.Added on 11 May 2021Alt.: 2020 UM39 || 
|- id="1999 YV20" bgcolor=#C2FFFF
| 0 ||  || JT || 14.85 || 6.0 km || multiple || 1999–2021 || 08 Dec 2021 || 58 || align=left | Disc.: Mauna Kea Obs.Added on 17 January 2021Greek camp (L4)Alt.: 2010 CG253 || 
|- id="1999 YD21" bgcolor=#E9E9E9
| 1 ||  || MBA-M || 18.25 || 1.2 km || multiple || 1999–2021 || 02 Oct 2021 || 26 || align=left | Disc.: Mauna Kea Obs.Added on 17 June 2021 || 
|- id="1999 YP23" bgcolor=#d6d6d6
| 0 ||  || MBA-O || 17.0 || 2.2 km || multiple || 1999–2021 || 15 May 2021 || 223 || align=left | Disc.: SpacewatchAlt.: 2016 FH38, 2018 UM35 || 
|- id="1999 YZ23" bgcolor=#E9E9E9
| 0 ||  || MBA-M || 17.5 || 1.8 km || multiple || 1999–2021 || 16 Jun 2021 || 47 || align=left | Disc.: Spacewatch || 
|- id="1999 YH25" bgcolor=#fefefe
| 0 ||  || MBA-I || 18.3 || data-sort-value="0.65" | 650 m || multiple || 1999–2019 || 27 Sep 2019 || 102 || align=left | Disc.: SpacewatchAlt.: 2009 SU310, 2010 AM147, 2016 XU7 || 
|- id="1999 YL26" bgcolor=#d6d6d6
| 0 ||  || MBA-O || 16.50 || 2.8 km || multiple || 1999–2021 || 30 Nov 2021 || 110 || align=left | Disc.: Spacewatch || 
|- id="1999 YA29" bgcolor=#E9E9E9
| 1 ||  || MBA-M || 17.9 || data-sort-value="0.78" | 780 m || multiple || 1999–2021 || 16 Jan 2021 || 51 || align=left | Disc.: Spacewatch || 
|- id="1999 YX29" bgcolor=#fefefe
| 0 ||  || MBA-I || 17.8 || data-sort-value="0.82" | 820 m || multiple || 1999–2020 || 12 Dec 2020 || 97 || align=left | Disc.: Spacewatch || 
|- id="1999 YY29" bgcolor=#fefefe
| 0 ||  || HUN || 18.4 || data-sort-value="0.62" | 620 m || multiple || 1999–2021 || 18 Jan 2021 || 109 || align=left | Disc.: Spacewatch || 
|- id="1999 YA30" bgcolor=#E9E9E9
| 0 ||  || MBA-M || 17.32 || 1.9 km || multiple || 1999–2021 || 26 Nov 2021 || 87 || align=left | Disc.: Spacewatch || 
|- id="1999 YB30" bgcolor=#E9E9E9
| 0 ||  || MBA-M || 16.95 || 2.3 km || multiple || 1999–2021 || 07 Nov 2021 || 140 || align=left | Disc.: Spacewatch || 
|- id="1999 YC30" bgcolor=#E9E9E9
| 0 ||  || MBA-M || 17.17 || 2.0 km || multiple || 1999–2021 || 11 Oct 2021 || 87 || align=left | Disc.: Spacewatch || 
|- id="1999 YD30" bgcolor=#d6d6d6
| 0 ||  || MBA-O || 16.94 || 2.3 km || multiple || 1999–2021 || 09 Apr 2021 || 66 || align=left | Disc.: Spacewatch || 
|- id="1999 YF30" bgcolor=#fefefe
| 0 ||  = (619195) || HUN || 18.2 || data-sort-value="0.68" | 680 m || multiple || 1999–2020 || 24 Jan 2020 || 93 || align=left | Disc.: Spacewatch || 
|- id="1999 YJ30" bgcolor=#E9E9E9
| 0 ||  || MBA-M || 17.8 || 1.2 km || multiple || 1999–2020 || 14 Nov 2020 || 88 || align=left | Disc.: Spacewatch || 
|- id="1999 YK30" bgcolor=#d6d6d6
| 0 ||  || MBA-O || 16.7 || 2.5 km || multiple || 1999–2020 || 27 Apr 2020 || 53 || align=left | Disc.: Spacewatch || 
|- id="1999 YL30" bgcolor=#d6d6d6
| 0 ||  || MBA-O || 16.27 || 3.1 km || multiple || 1999–2022 || 06 Jan 2022 || 137 || align=left | Disc.: Spacewatch || 
|- id="1999 YN30" bgcolor=#C2FFFF
| 0 ||  || JT || 14.69 || 6.4 km || multiple || 1999–2021 || 11 Nov 2021 || 273 || align=left | Disc.: SpacewatchGreek camp (L4)Alt.: 2009 WK292 || 
|- id="1999 YO30" bgcolor=#C2FFFF
| 0 ||  || JT || 14.26 || 7.8 km || multiple || 1999–2021 || 28 Nov 2021 || 123 || align=left | Disc.: SpacewatchGreek camp (L4)Alt.: 2013 BW16 || 
|- id="1999 YP30" bgcolor=#fefefe
| 1 ||  || MBA-I || 18.6 || data-sort-value="0.57" | 570 m || multiple || 1999–2019 || 19 Sep 2019 || 47 || align=left | Disc.: Spacewatch || 
|- id="1999 YR30" bgcolor=#fefefe
| 2 ||  || MBA-I || 18.8 || data-sort-value="0.52" | 520 m || multiple || 1999–2021 || 16 Jan 2021 || 51 || align=left | Disc.: SpacewatchAdded on 17 January 2021 || 
|- id="1999 YS30" bgcolor=#E9E9E9
| 0 ||  || MBA-M || 17.5 || data-sort-value="0.94" | 940 m || multiple || 1999–2021 || 07 Jan 2021 || 60 || align=left | Disc.: SpacewatchAdded on 9 March 2021 || 
|}
back to top

References 
 

Lists of unnumbered minor planets